= List of birds of New York (state) =

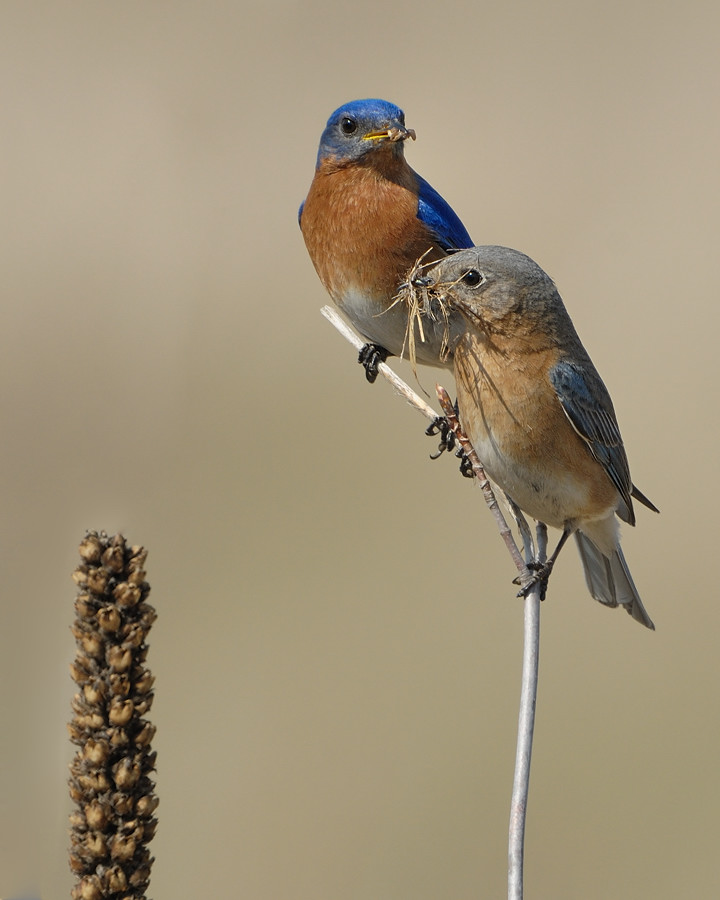
The eastern bluebird is New York's state bird

The following list of birds of New York included the 503 species and a species pair of wild birds documented in New York as of August 2022. Unless noted otherwise, the source is the Checklist of New York State Birds published by the New York State Avian Records Committee (NYSARC) of the New York State Ornithological Association. These species represent 23 orders and 67 families of birds. An additional, "hypothetical", species is also noted by NYSARC. Additional accidental species have also been added from other sources.

This list is presented in the taxonomic sequence of the Check-list of North and Middle American Birds, 7th edition through the 62nd Supplement, published by the American Ornithological Society (AOS). Common and scientific names are also those of the Check-list, except that the common names of families are from the Clements taxonomy because the AOS list does not include them.

Unless otherwise noted, all species listed below are considered to occur regularly in New York as permanent residents, summer or winter visitors, or migrants. These tags are used to annotate some species:

- (B) Breeding - a species that currently breeds or has bred in New York (249 species)
- (†) Extinct - a species that used to live in what is now New York but is now extinct (2 or 3 species)
- (E) Extirpated - a species that no longer occurs in New York, but populations exist elsewhere (2 species)
- (I) Introduced - a population established solely as result of direct or indirect human intervention; synonymous with non-native and non-indigenous (8 species)
- (IE) - an introduced population existed but is now extirpated (2 species)
- (H) Hypothetical - a species with sight records but no description, specimen, or photograph (1 species)

Other markings denote birds that NYSARC requests documentation of in certain conditions:

- (N) - documentation of this species should be submitted if seen anywhere in New York (160 species)
- (U) - documentation of this species should be submitted if seen in upstate New York (30 species)
- (D) - documentation of this species should be submitted if seen in downstate New York (4 species)
- (A) - documentation of this species should be submitted if seen outside the Adirondacks (3 species)
- (P) - documentation of this species should be submitted if seen outside of the pelagic zone (between 3 and 200 miles from shore) but within New York State. (4 species)
- (S) - documentation of this species should be submitted if seen in New York in spring (3 species)

== Ducks, geese, and waterfowl ==
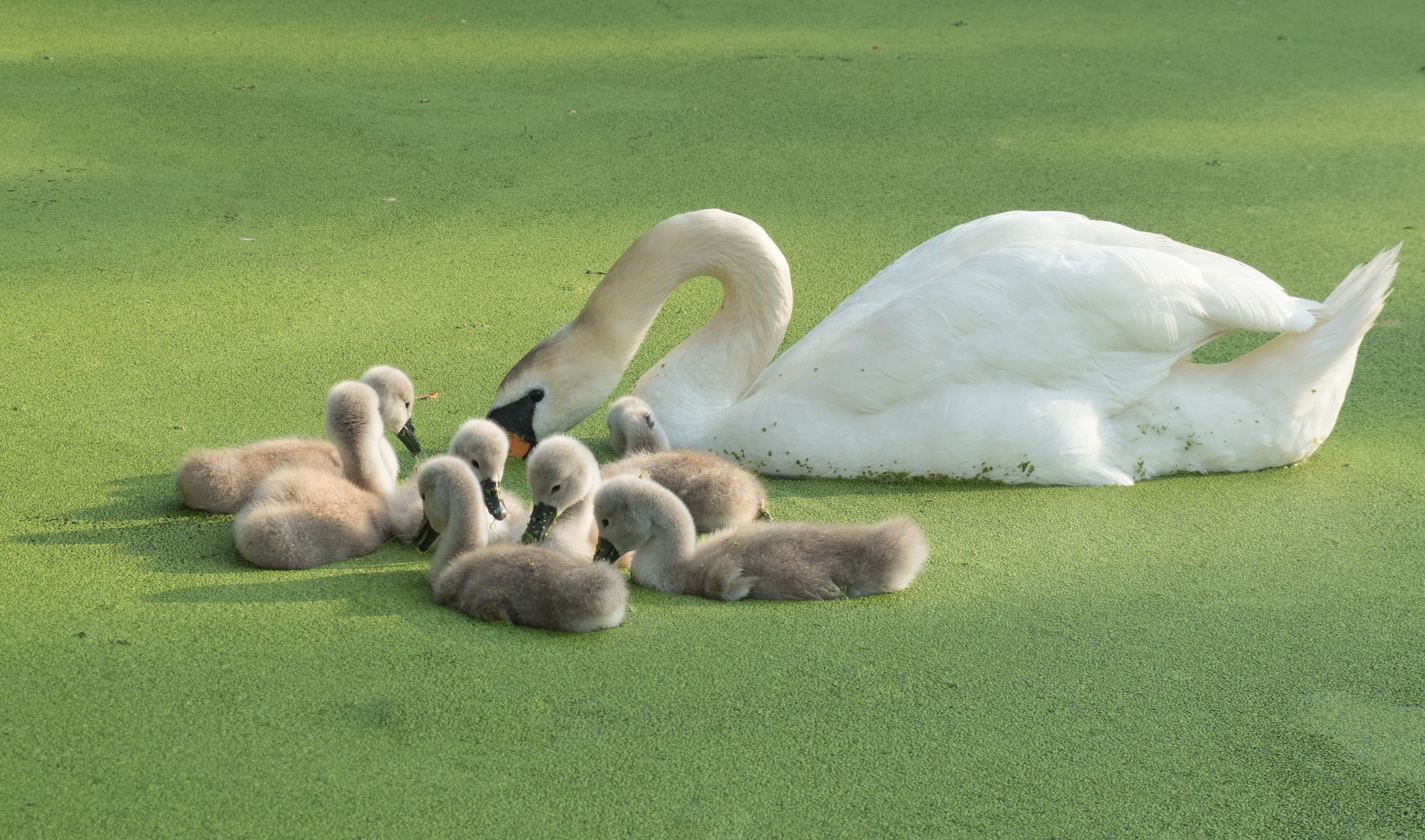
Mute swan and cygnets on the Prospect Park Lake

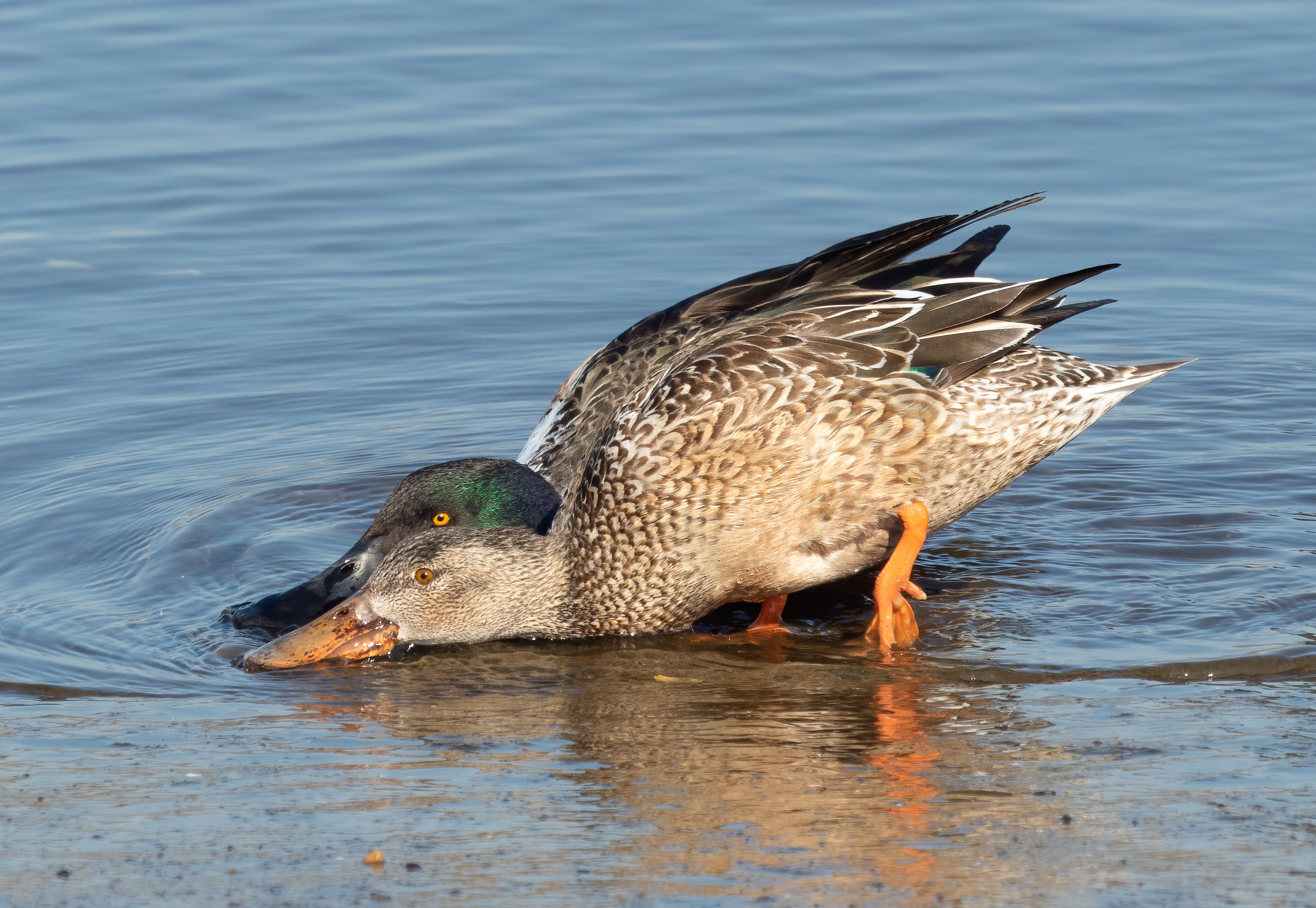
Northern shoveler pair dabbling in Marine Park, Brooklyn

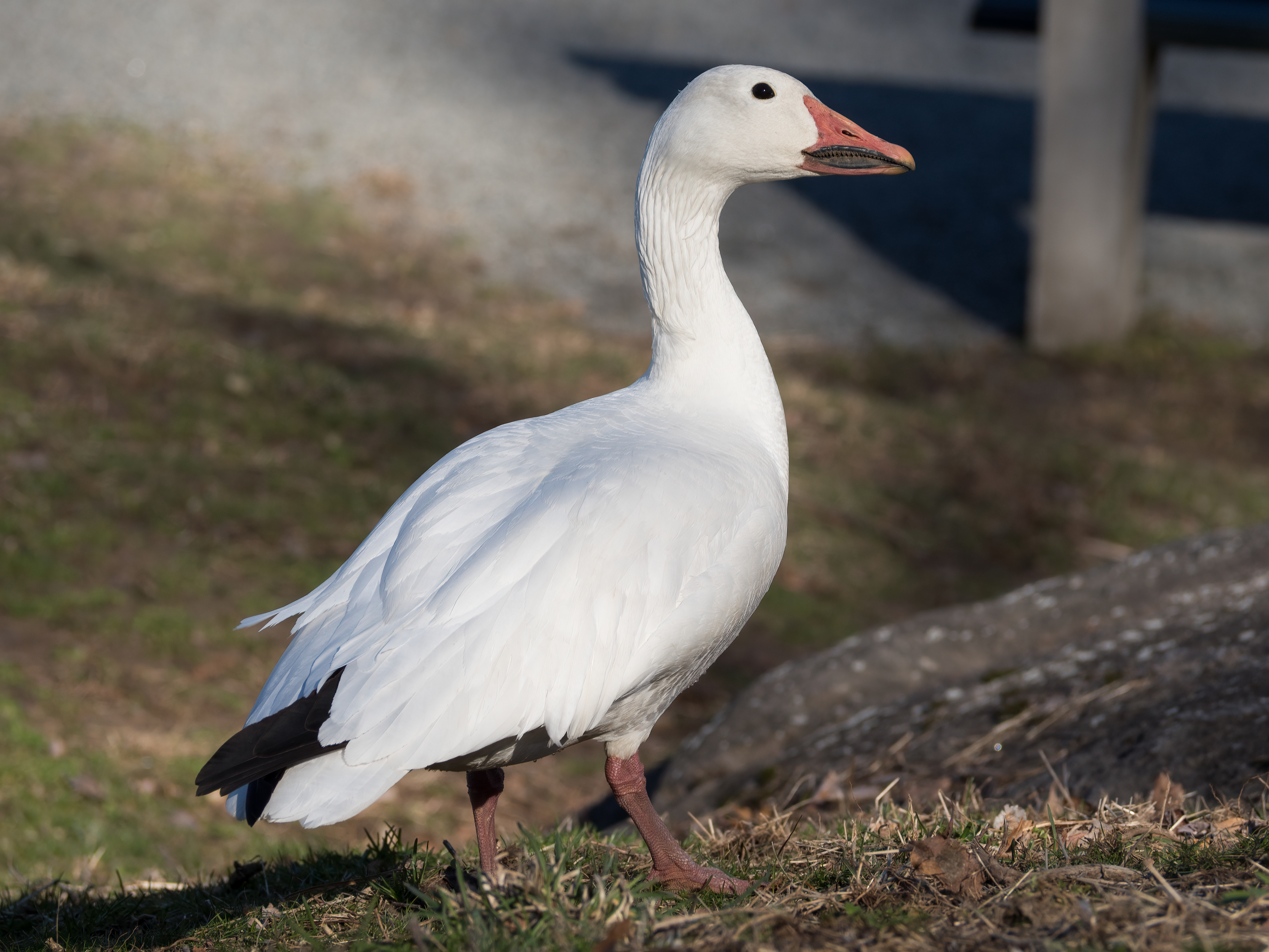
Snow goose by Harlem Meer

Order: Anseriformes Family: Anatidae

The family Anatidae includes the ducks and most duck-like waterfowl, such as geese and swans. These birds are adapted to an aquatic existence with webbed feet, bills which are flattened to a greater or lesser extent, and feathers that are excellent at shedding water due to special oils. Fifty species have been recorded in New York.

- Black-bellied whistling-duck, Dendrocygna autumnalis (N)
- Fulvous whistling-duck, Dendrocygna bicolor (N)
- Snow goose, Anser caerulescens
- Ross's goose, Anser rossii
- Greater white-fronted goose, Anser albifrons
- Taiga bean-goose, Anser fabalis (accidental)
- Tundra bean-goose, Anser serrirostris (N)
- Pink-footed goose, Anser brachyrhynchus (N)
- Brant, Branta bernicla
- Barnacle goose, Branta leucopsis (U)
- Cackling goose, Branta hutchinsii
- Canada goose, Branta canadensis (B)
- Mute swan, Cygnus olor (I)(B)
- Trumpeter swan, Cygnus buccinator (B)(D)
- Tundra swan, Cygnus columbianus
- Wood duck, Aix sponsa (B)
- Garganey, Spatula querquedula (N)
- Blue-winged teal, Spatula discors (B)
- Cinnamon teal, Spatula cyanoptera (N)
- Northern shoveler, Spatula clypeata (B)
- Gadwall, Mareca strepera (B)
- Eurasian wigeon, Mareca penelope
- American wigeon, Mareca americana (B)
- Mallard, Anas platyrhynchos (B)
- American black duck, Anas rubripes (B)
- Northern pintail, Anas acuta (B)
- Green-winged teal, Anas crecca (B)
- Canvasback, Aythya valisineria (B)
- Redhead, Aythya americana (B)
- Common pochard, Aythya ferina (accidental)
- Ring-necked duck, Aythya collaris (B)
- Tufted duck, Aythya fuligula (U)
- Greater scaup, Aythya marila
- Lesser scaup, Aythya affinis (B)
- Labrador duck, Camptorhynchus labradorius (†)
- King eider, Somateria spectabilis
- Common eider, Somateria mollissima (U)(B)
- Harlequin duck, Histrionicus histrionicus
- Surf scoter, Melanitta perspicillata
- White-winged scoter, Melanitta deglandi
- Black scoter, Melanitta americana
- Long-tailed duck, Clangula hyemalis
- Bufflehead, Bucephala albeola
- Common goldeneye, Bucephala clangula (B)
- Barrow's goldeneye, Bucephala islandica
- Smew, Mergellus albellus (N)
- Hooded merganser, Lophodytes cucullatus (B)
- Common merganser, Mergus merganser (B)
- Red-breasted merganser, Mergus serrator (B)
- Ruddy duck, Oxyura jamaicensis (B)

== New World quail ==
Order: Galliformes Family: Odontophoridae

The New World quails are small, plump terrestrial birds only distantly related to the quails of the Old World, but named for their similar appearance and habits. One species has been recorded in New York.

- Northern bobwhite, Colinus virginianus (B)

== Pheasants, grouse, and allies ==
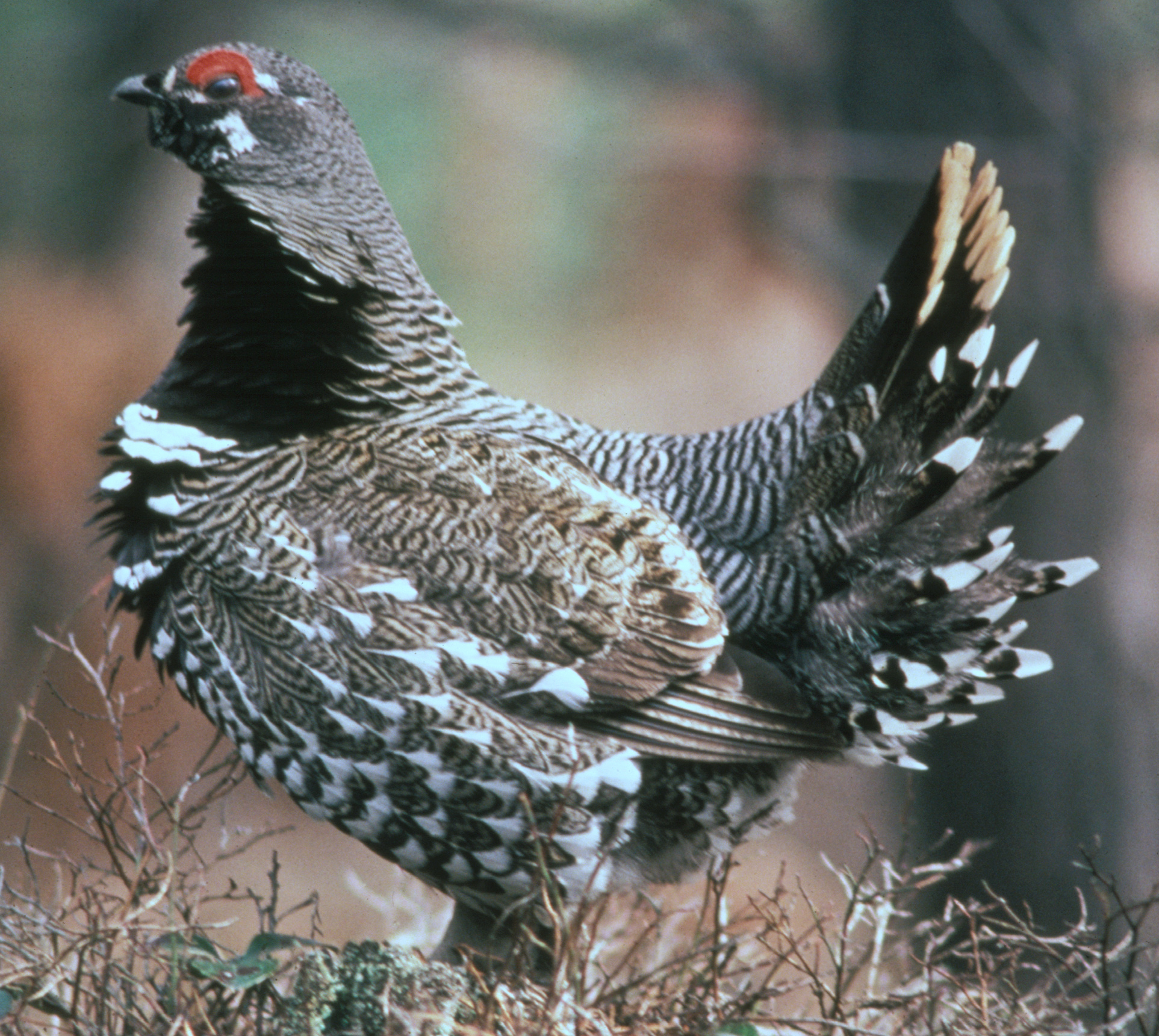
Spruce grouse

Order: Galliformes Family: Phasianidae

Phasianidae consists of the pheasants and their allies. These are terrestrial species, variable in size but generally plump with broad relatively short wings. Many species are gamebirds or have been domesticated as a food source for humans. Seven species have been recorded in New York.

- Wild turkey, Meleagris gallopavo (B)
- Ruffed grouse, Bonasa umbellus (B)
- Spruce grouse, Canachites canadensis (A)(B)
- Willow ptarmigan, Lagopus lagopus (N)
- Greater prairie chicken, Tympanuchus cupido (E)
  - Heath hen, T. c. cupido (†)
- Gray partridge, Perdix perdix (I)(N)(B)
- Ring-necked pheasant, Phasianus colchicus (I)(B)

== Flamingos ==
Order: Phoenicopteriformes Family: Phoenicopteridae

Flamingos (genus Phoenicopterus monotypic in family Phoenicopteridae) are gregarious wading birds, usually 3 to 5 feet (0.9 to 1.5 m) tall, found in both the Western and Eastern Hemispheres. Flamingos filter-feed on shellfish and algae. Their oddly-shaped beaks are specially adapted to separate mud and silt from the food they consume and, uniquely, are used upside-down. One species has been recorded in New York.

- American flamingo, Phoenicopterus ruber (accidental)

== Grebes ==
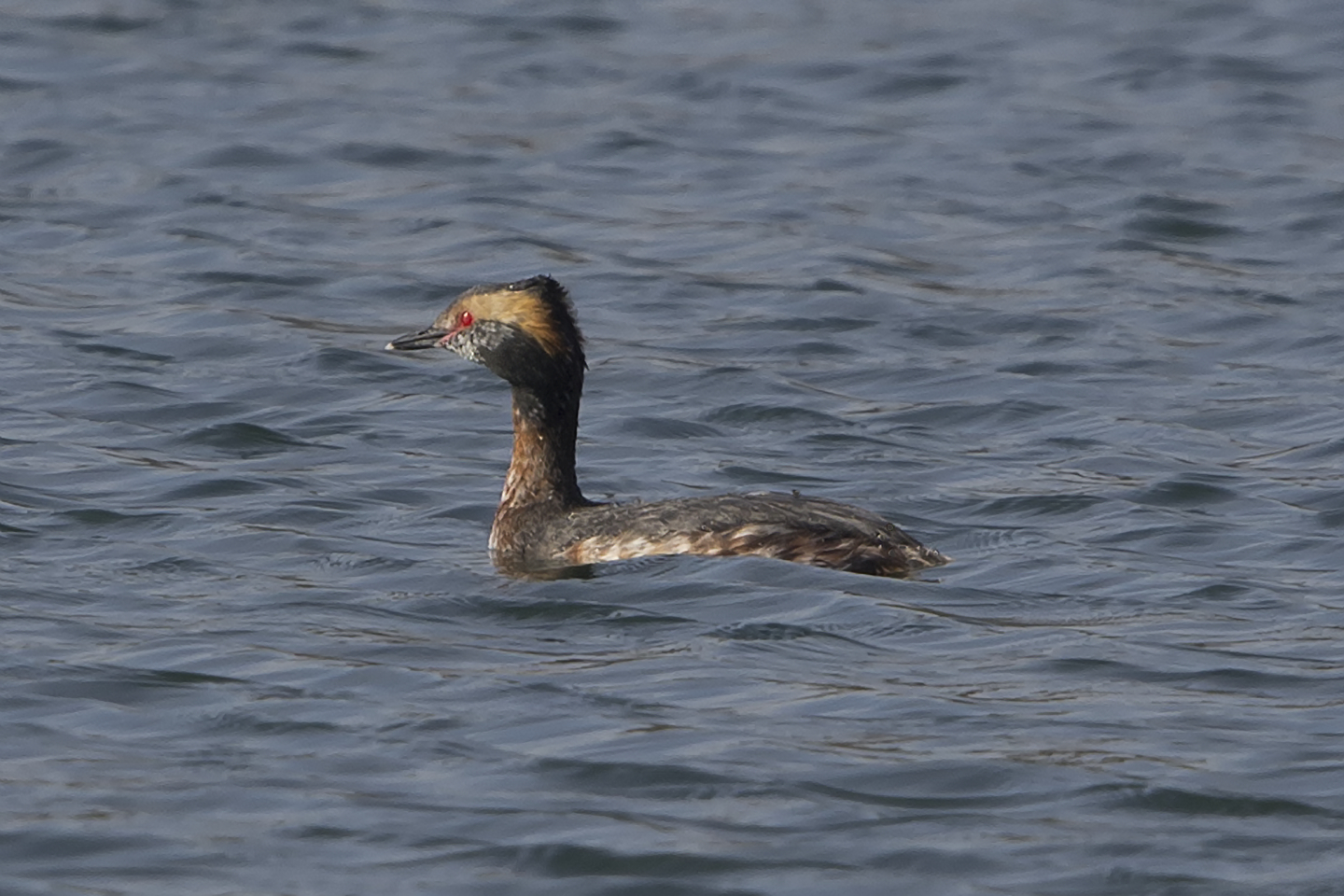
Horned grebe in Mount Sinai, New York

Order: Podicipediformes Family: Podicipedidae

Grebes are small to medium-large diving birds that breed on fresh water. They have lobed toes and are excellent swimmers and divers. However, they have their feet placed far back on the body, making them quite ungainly on land. Six species have been recorded in New York.

- Pied-billed grebe, Podilymbus podiceps (B)
- Horned grebe, Podiceps auritus
- Red-necked grebe, Podiceps grisegena
- Eared grebe, Podiceps nigricollis
- Western grebe, Aechmophorus occidentalis (N)
- Clark's grebe, Aechmorphorus clarkii (N)

== Pigeons and doves ==
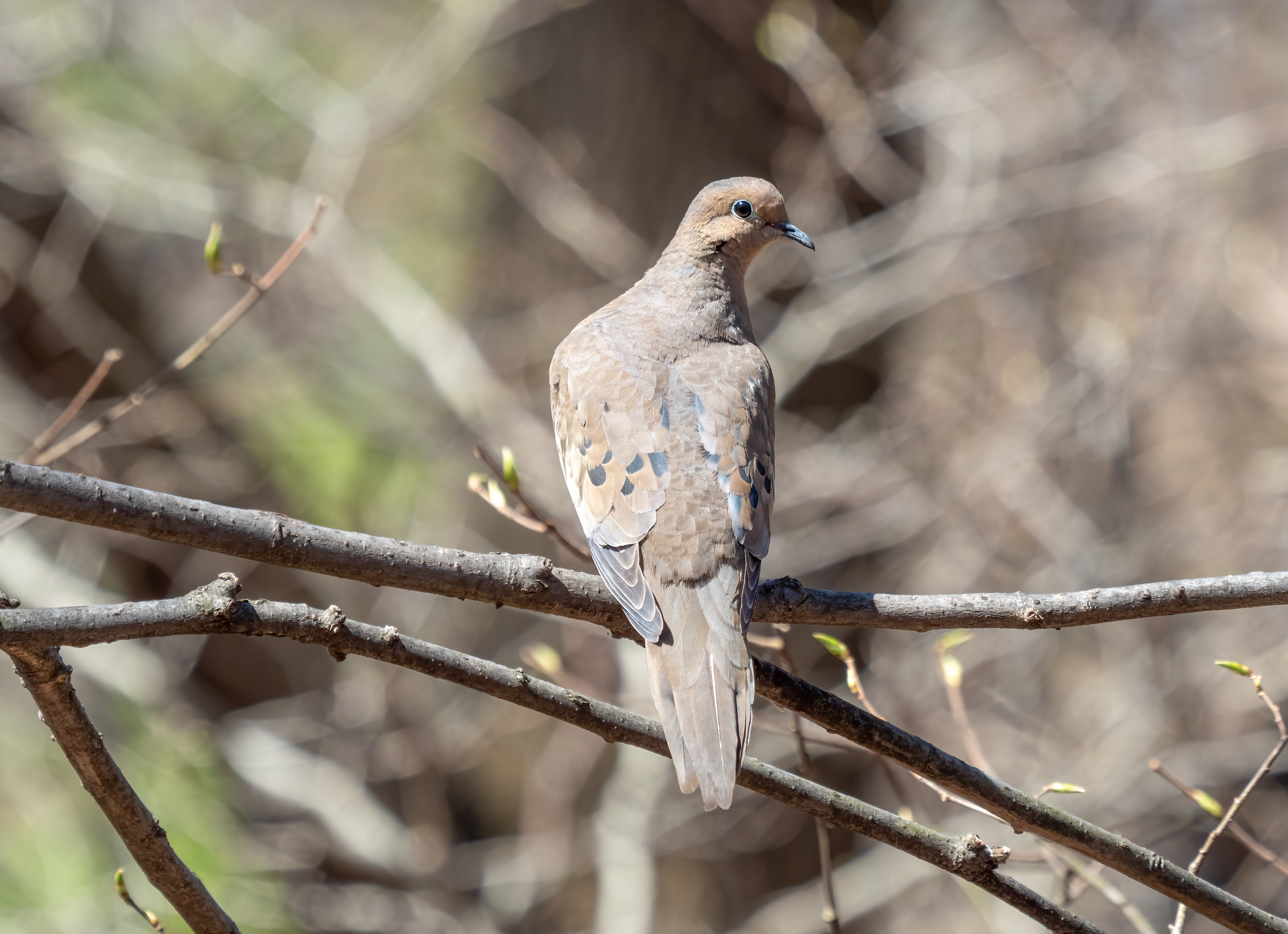
Mourning dove in Central Park

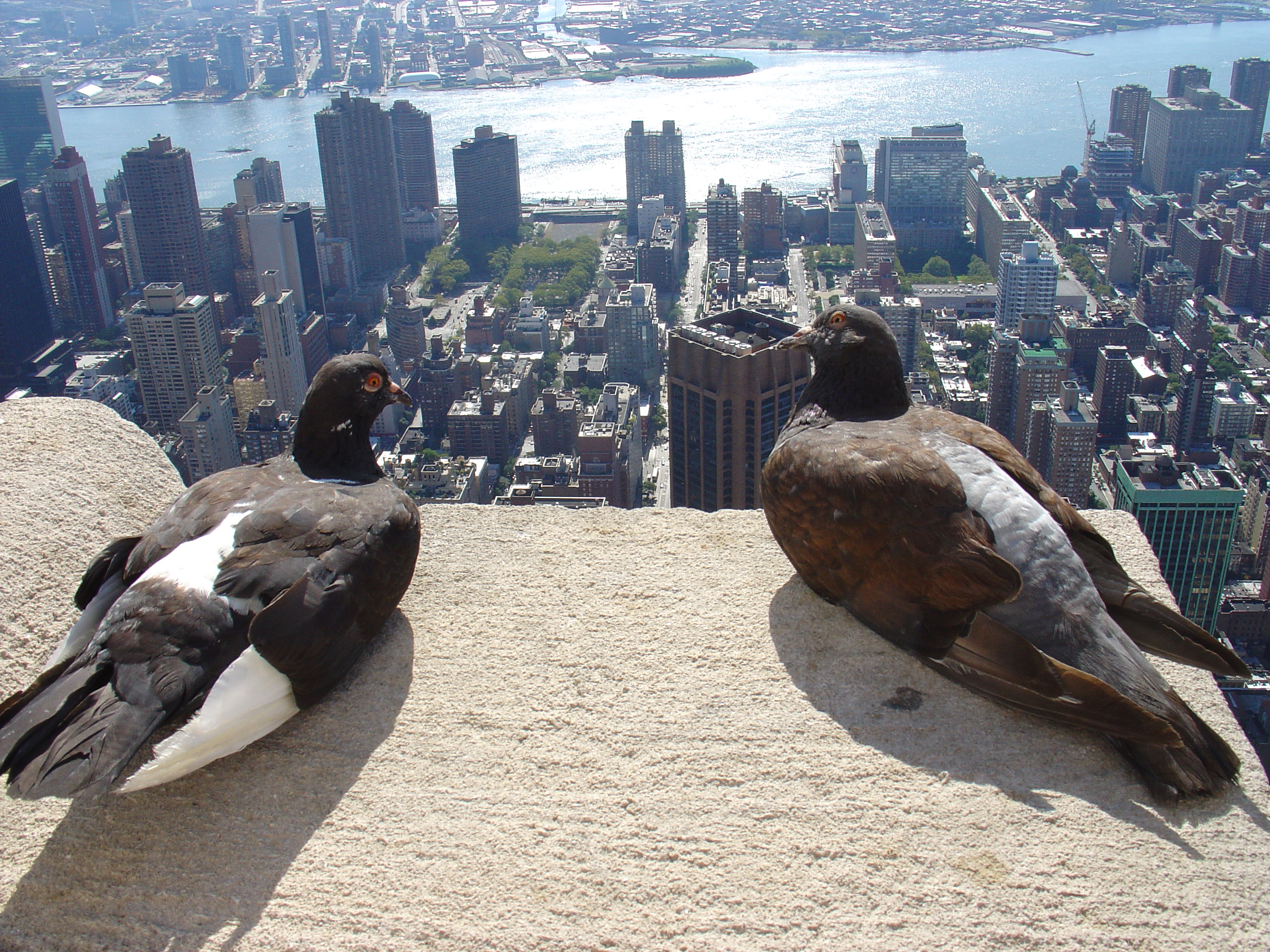
Feral pigeons on the Empire State Building

Order: Columbiformes Family: Columbidae

Pigeons and doves are stout-bodied birds with short necks and short slender bills with a fleshy cere. Eight species have been recorded in New York.

- Rock pigeon, Columba livia (I)(B)
- Band-tailed pigeon, Patagioenas fasciata (N)
- Eurasian collared-dove, Streptopelia decaocto (N)
- Passenger pigeon, Ectopistes migratorius (†)(B)
- Inca dove, Columbina inca (N)
- Common ground dove, Columbina passerina (N)
- White-winged dove, Zenaida asiatica (N)
- Mourning dove, Zenaida macroura (B)

== Cuckoos ==
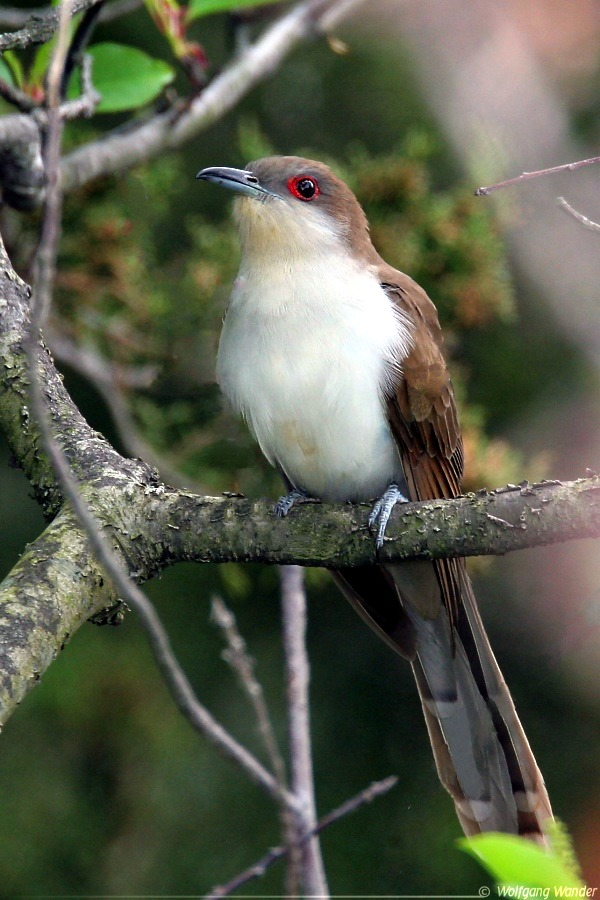
Black-billed cuckoo on West Meadow Beach

Order: Cuculiformes Family: Cuculidae

The family Cuculidae includes cuckoos, roadrunners, and anis. These birds are of variable size with slender bodies, long tails, and strong legs. Three species have been recorded in New York.

- Common cuckoo, Cuculus canorus (accidental)
- Yellow-billed cuckoo, Coccyzus americanus (B)
- Black-billed cuckoo, Coccyzus erythropthalmus (B)

== Nightjars and allies ==
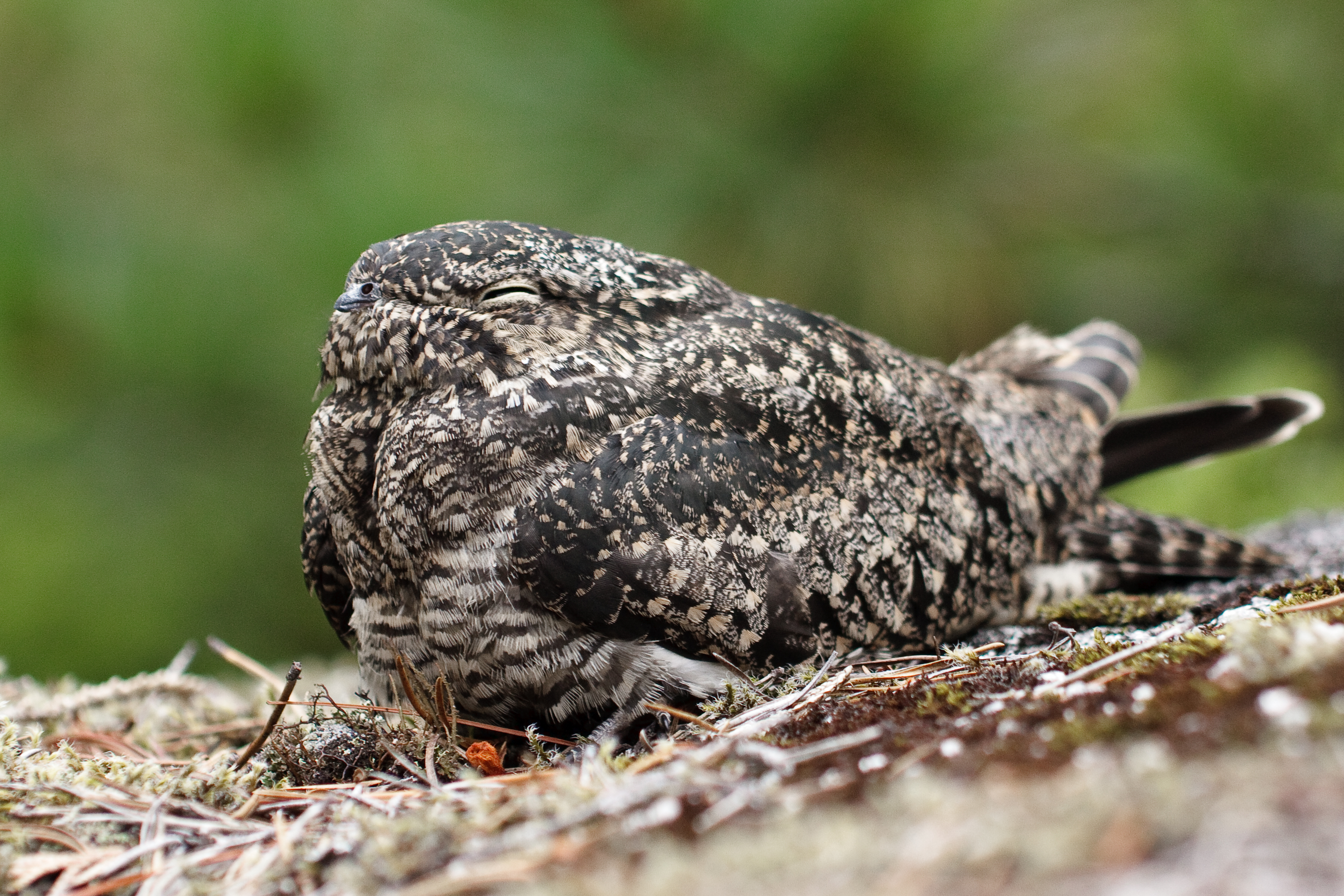
Common nighthawk

Order: Caprimulgiformes Family: Caprimulgidae

Nightjars are medium-sized nocturnal birds that usually nest on the ground. They have long wings, short legs, and very short bills. Most have small feet, of little use for walking, and long pointed wings. Their soft plumage is cryptically colored to resemble bark or leaves. Three species have been recorded in New York.

- Common nighthawk, Chordeiles minor (B)
- Chuck-will's-widow, Antrostomus carolinensis (U)(B)
- Eastern whip-poor-will, Antrostomus vociferus (B)

== Swifts ==
Order: Apodiformes Family: Apodidae

The swifts are small birds which spend the majority of their lives flying. These birds have very short legs and never settle voluntarily on the ground, perching instead only on vertical surfaces. Many swifts have long swept-back wings which resemble a crescent or boomerang. One species has been recorded in New York.

- Chimney swift, Chaetura pelagica (B)

== Hummingbirds ==
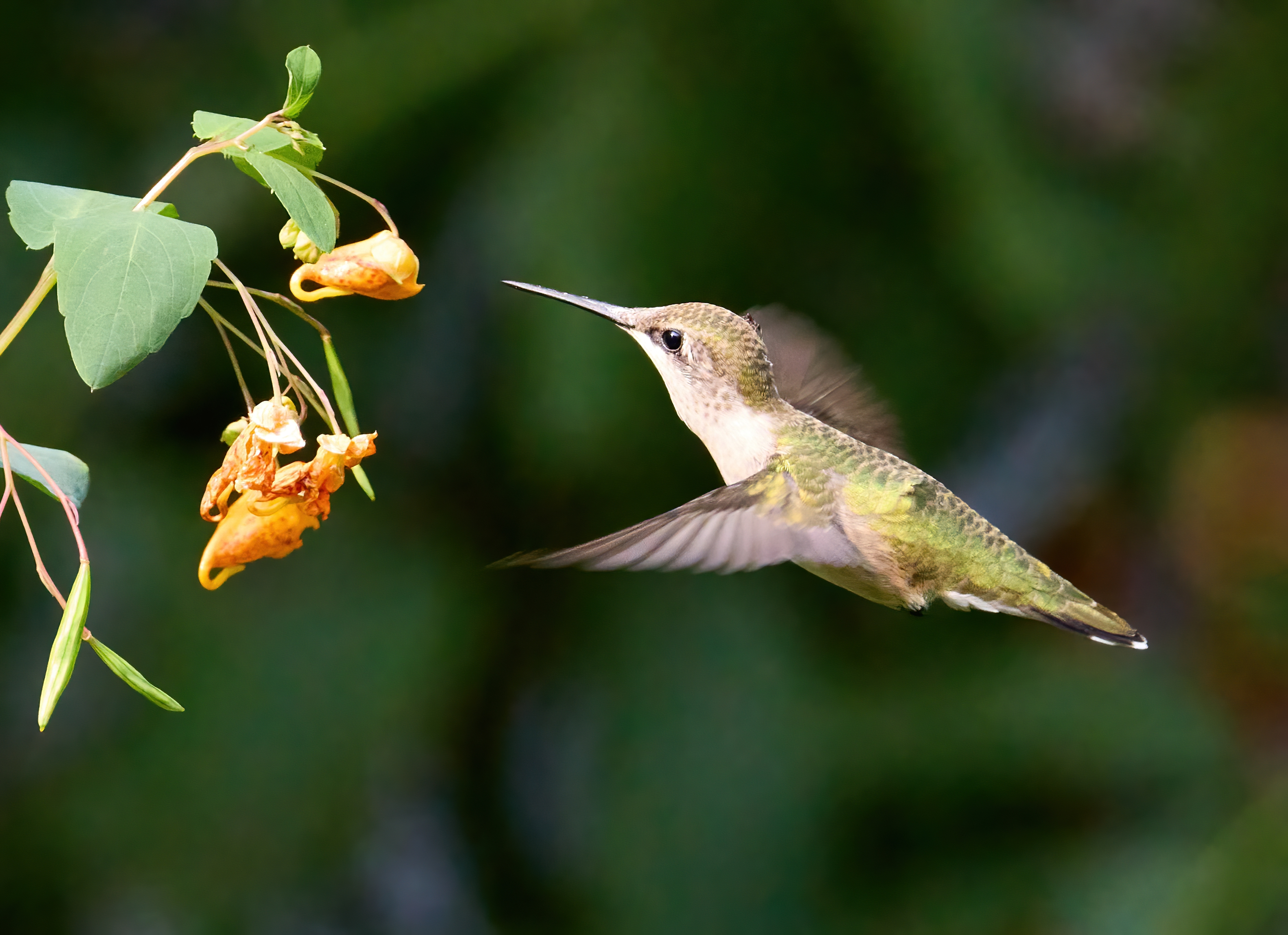
Ruby-throated hummingbird in Brooklyn Bridge Park

Order: Apodiformes Family: Trochilidae

Hummingbirds are small birds capable of hovering in mid-air due to the rapid flapping of their wings. They are the only birds that can fly backwards. Five species have been recorded in New York.

- Ruby-throated hummingbird, Archilochus colubris (B)
- Anna's hummingbird, Calypte anna (N)
- Calliope hummingbird, Selasphorus calliope (N)
- Rufous hummingbird, Selasphorus rufus (N)
- Broad-billed hummingbird, Colibri thalassinus (N)

== Rails, gallinules, and coots ==
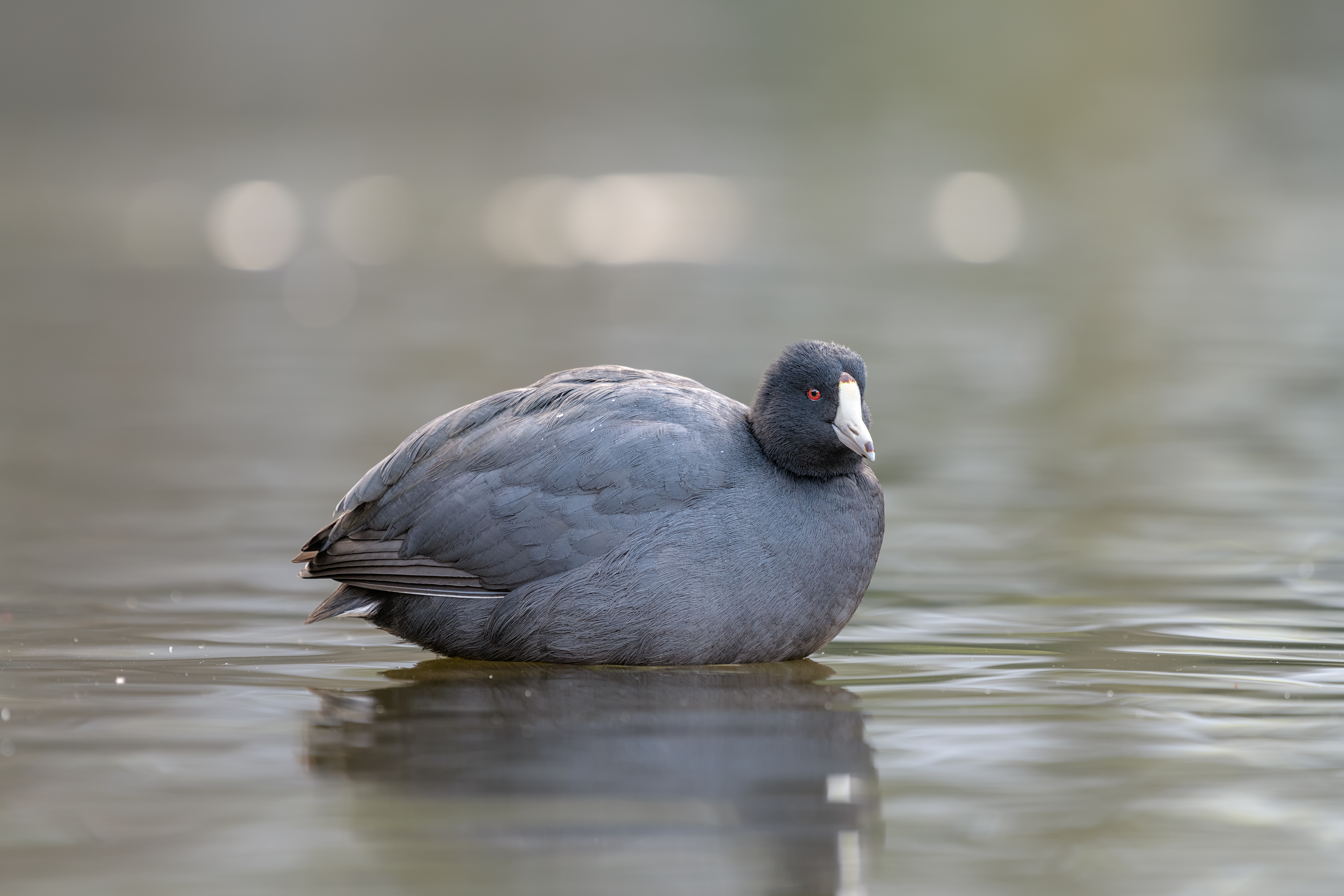
American coot in the Central Park Pond

Order: Gruiformes Family: Rallidae

Rallidae is a large family of small to medium-sized birds which includes the rails, crakes, coots, and gallinules. The most typical family members occupy dense vegetation in damp environments near lakes, swamps, or rivers. In general they are shy and secretive birds, making them difficult to observe. Most species have strong legs and long toes which are well adapted to soft uneven surfaces. They tend to have short rounded wings and to be weak fliers. Eleven species have been recorded in New York.

- Clapper rail, Rallus crepitans (U)(B)
- King rail, Rallus elegans (N)(B)
- Virginia rail, Rallus limicola (B)
- Corn crake, Crex crex (N)
- Sora, Porzana carolina (B)
- Common gallinule, Gallinula galeata (B)
- American coot, Fulica americana (B)
- Purple gallinule, Porphyrio martinicus (N)
- Azure gallinule, Porphyrio flavirostris (N)
- Yellow rail, Coturnicops noveboracensis (N)
- Black rail, Laterallus jamaicensis (N)(B)

== Cranes ==
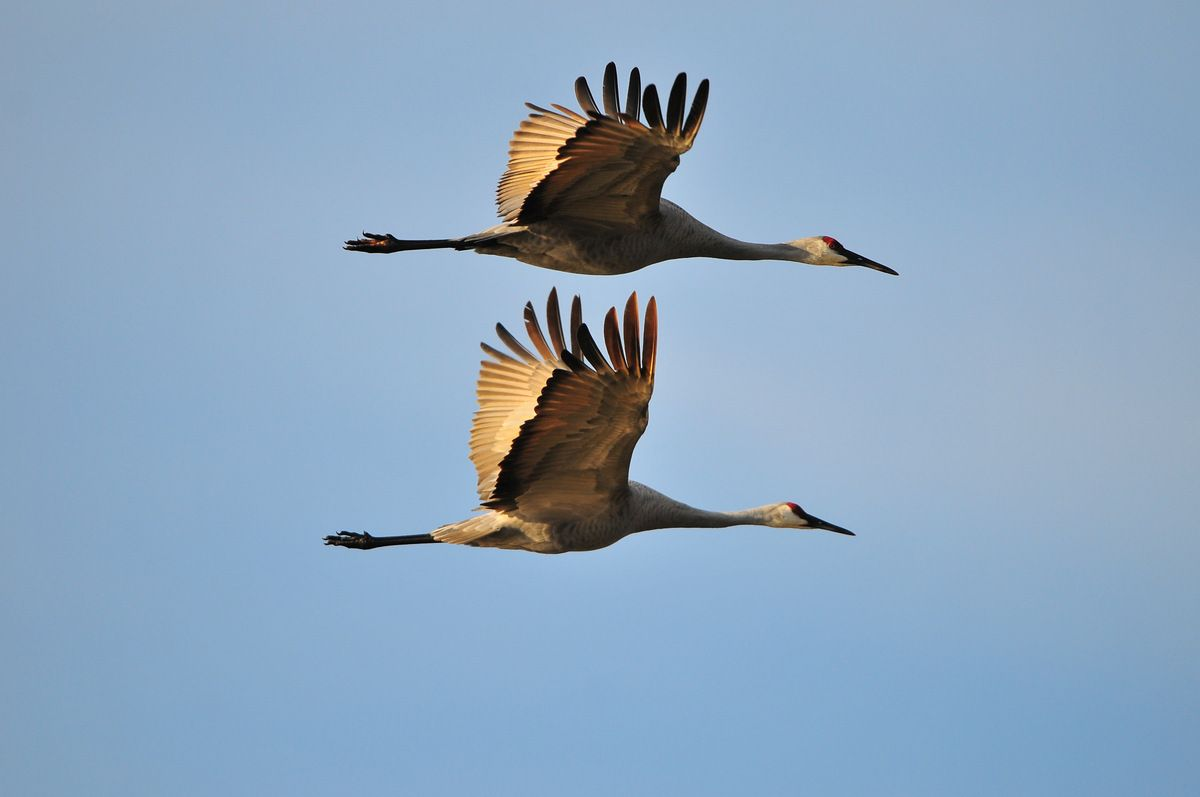
Two sandhill cranes flying over Montezuma National Wildlife Refuge

Order: Gruiformes Family: Gruidae

Cranes are large, long-legged, and long-necked birds. Unlike the similar-looking but unrelated herons, cranes fly with necks outstretched, not pulled back. Most have elaborate and noisy courting displays or "dances". One species has been recorded in New York.

- Sandhill crane, Antigone canadensis (B)

== Stilts and avocets ==
Order: Charadriiformes Family: Recurvirostridae

Recurvirostridae is a family of large wading birds which includes the avocets and stilts. The avocets have long legs and long up-curved bills. The stilts have extremely long legs and long, thin, straight bills. Two species have been recorded in New York.

- Black-necked stilt, Himantopus mexicanus (N)
- American avocet, Recurvirostra americana

== Oystercatchers ==
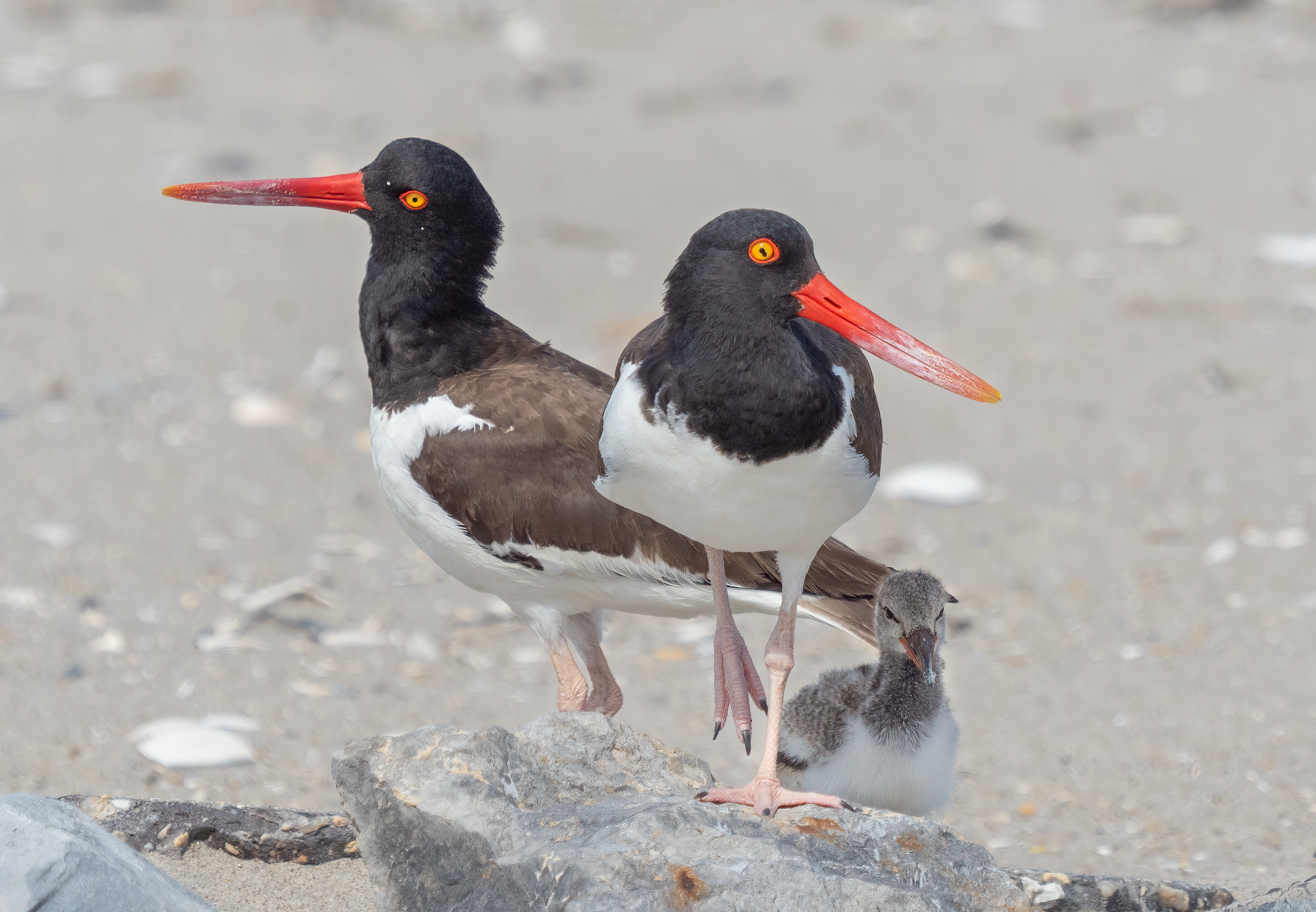
American oystercatchers with chick at Fort Tilden

Order: Charadriiformes Family: Haematopodidae

The oystercatchers are large, obvious, noisy plover-like birds with strong bills used for smashing or prying open molluscs. One species has been recorded in New York.

- American oystercatcher, Haematopus palliatus (U)(B)

== Plovers and lapwings ==
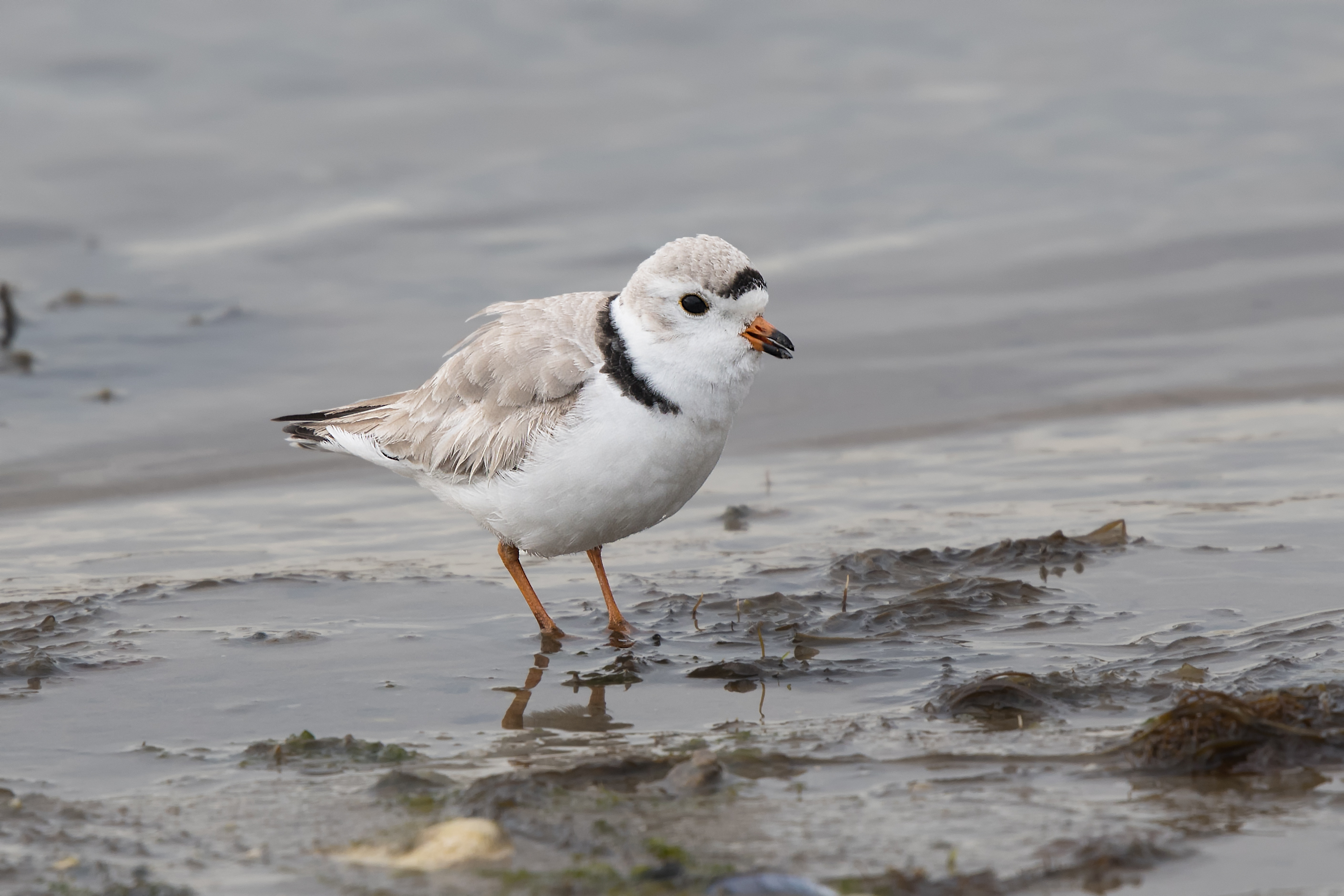
Piping plover in Strongs Neck, New York

Order: Charadriiformes Family: Charadriidae

The family Charadriidae includes the plovers, dotterels, and lapwings. They are small to medium-sized birds with compact bodies, short thick necks, and long, usually pointed, wings. They are found in open country worldwide, mostly in habitats near water. Ten species have been recorded in New York.

- Northern lapwing, Vanellus vanellus (N)
- Black-bellied plover, Pluvialis squatarola
- American golden-plover, Pluvialis dominica
- Pacific golden-plover, Pluvialis fulva (N)
- Killdeer, Charadrius vociferus (B)
- Semipalmated plover, Charadrius semipalmatus
- Piping plover, Charadrius melodus (U)(B)
- Common ringed plover, Charadrius hiaticula (N)
- Wilson's plover, Charadrius wilsonia (N)
- Snowy plover, Charadrius nivosus (N)

== Sandpipers and allies ==
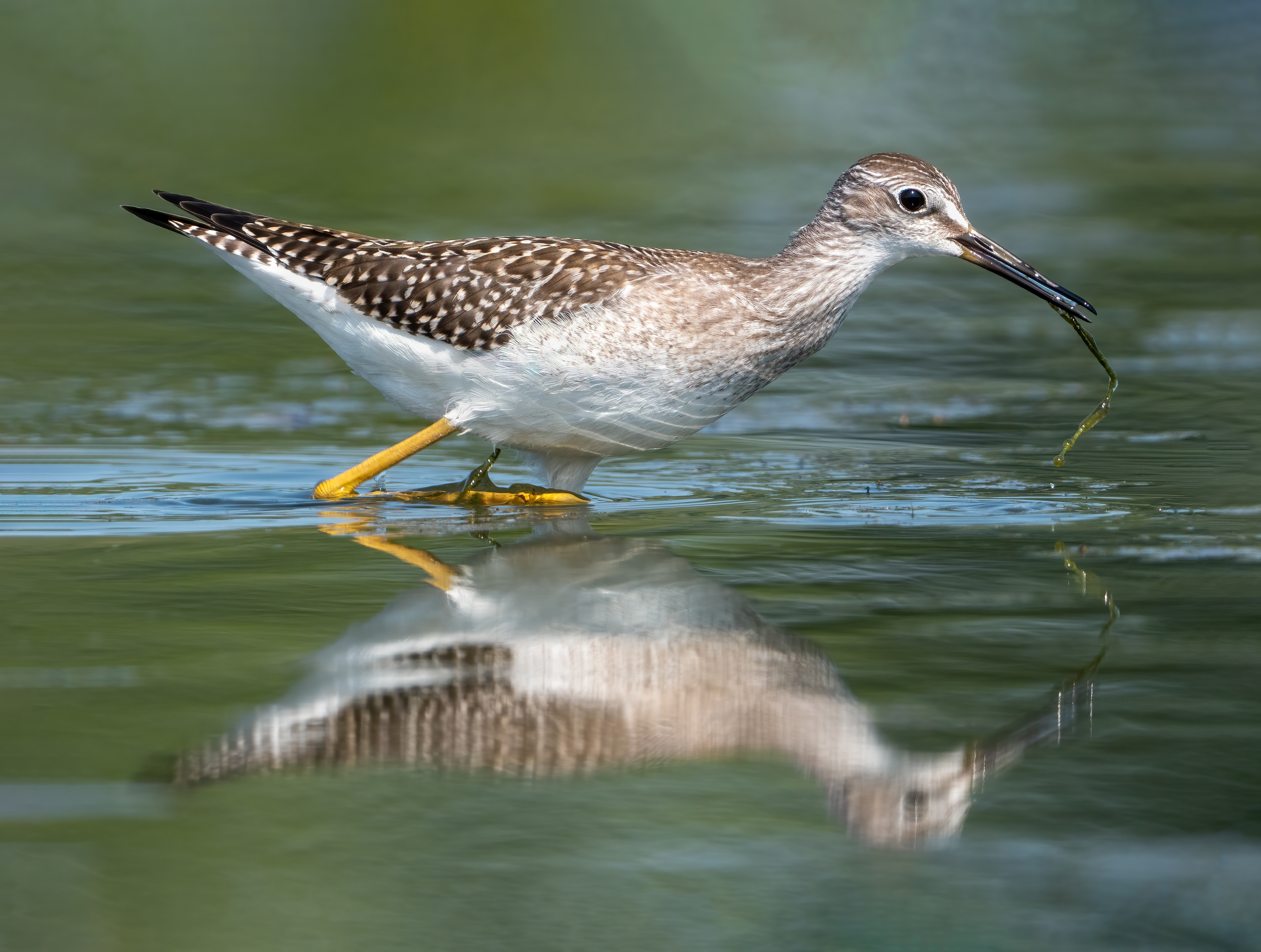
Lesser yellowlegs in Jamaica Bay Wildlife Refuge

American woodcock in Bryant Park

Order: Charadriiformes Family: Scolopacidae

Scolopacidae is a large, diverse family of small to medium-sized shorebirds which includes the sandpipers, curlews, godwits, shanks, tattlers, woodcocks, snipes, dowitchers, and phalaropes. Most species eat small invertebrates picked out of the mud or soil. Different lengths of legs and bills enable multiple species to feed in the same habitat, particularly on the coast, without direct competition for food. Forty-three species have been recorded in New York.

- Upland sandpiper, Bartramia longicauda (B)
- Whimbrel, Numenius phaeopus
- Eskimo curlew, Numenius borealis (E) (†?)
- Long-billed curlew, Numenius americanus (N)
- Eurasian curlew, Numenius arquata (N)
- Bar-tailed godwit, Limosa lapponica (N)
- Black-tailed godwit, Limosa limosa (N)
- Hudsonian godwit, Limosa haemastica
- Marbled godwit, Limosa fedoa
- Ruddy turnstone, Arenaria interpres
- Red knot, Calidris canutus
- Ruff, Calidris pugnax (N)
- Broad-billed sandpiper, Calidris falcinellus (N)
- Sharp-tailed sandpiper, Calidris acuminata (N)
- Stilt sandpiper, Calidris himantopus
- Curlew sandpiper, Calidris ferruginea (N)
- Red-necked stint, Calidris ruficollis (N)
- Sanderling, Calidris alba
- Dunlin, Calidris alpina
- Purple sandpiper, Calidris maritima
- Baird's sandpiper, Calidris bairdii (S)
- Little stint, Calidris minuta (N)
- Least sandpiper, Calidris minutilla
- White-rumped sandpiper, Calidris fuscicollis
- Buff-breasted sandpiper, Calidris subruficollis
- Pectoral sandpiper, Calidris melanotos
- Semipalmated sandpiper, Calidris pusilla
- Western sandpiper, Calidris mauri (S)(U)
- Short-billed dowitcher, Limnodromus griseus
- Long-billed dowitcher, Limnodromus scolopaceus
- American woodcock, Scolopax minor (B)
- Wilson's snipe, Gallinago delicata (B)
- Spotted sandpiper, Actitis macularia (B)
- Solitary sandpiper, Tringa solitaria
- Lesser yellowlegs, Tringa flavipes
- Willet, Tringa semipalmata (B)
- Spotted redshank, Tringa erythropus (N)
- Common greenshank, Tringa nebularia (N)
- Greater yellowlegs, Tringa melanoleuca
- Wood sandpiper, Tringa glareola (N)
- Wilson's phalarope, Phalaropus tricolor (B)
- Red-necked phalarope, Phalaropus lobatus
- Red phalarope, Phalaropus fulicarius

== Skuas and jaegers ==
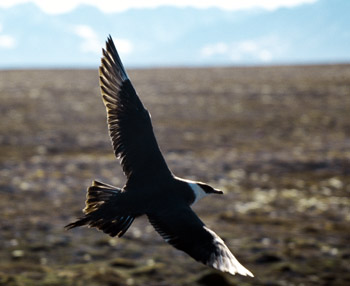
Parasitic jaeger

Order: Charadriiformes Family: Stercorariidae

Skuas and jaegers are long-distant migrants, breeding on the high arctic tundra but flying as far as Antarctica. During the breeding season, they hunt small mammals and birds, but at other times of the year they will scavenge and steal food from other birds. Five species have been recorded in New York.

- Great skua, Stercorarius skua (N)
- South polar skua, Stercorarius maccormicki (N)
- Pomarine jaeger, Stercorarius pomarinus
- Parasitic jaeger, Stercorarius parasiticus
- Long-tailed jaeger, Stercorarius longicaudus (P)

== Auks, murres, and puffins ==
Order: Charadriiformes Family: Alcidae

Alcids are superficially similar to penguins in their black-and-white colors, their upright posture, and some of their habits. However they are only distantly related to the penguins and are able to fly. Auks live on the open sea, deliberately coming ashore only to nest. Eight species have been recorded in New York.

- Dovekie, Alle alle (U)
- Common murre, Uria aalge (P)
- Thick-billed murre, Uria lomvia (N)
- Razorbill, Alca torda (U)
- Black guillemot, Cepphus grylle (U)
- Long-billed murrelet, Brachyramphus perdix (N)
- Ancient murrelet, Synthliboramphus antiques (N)
- Atlantic puffin, Fratercula arctica (N)

== Gulls, terns, and skimmers ==
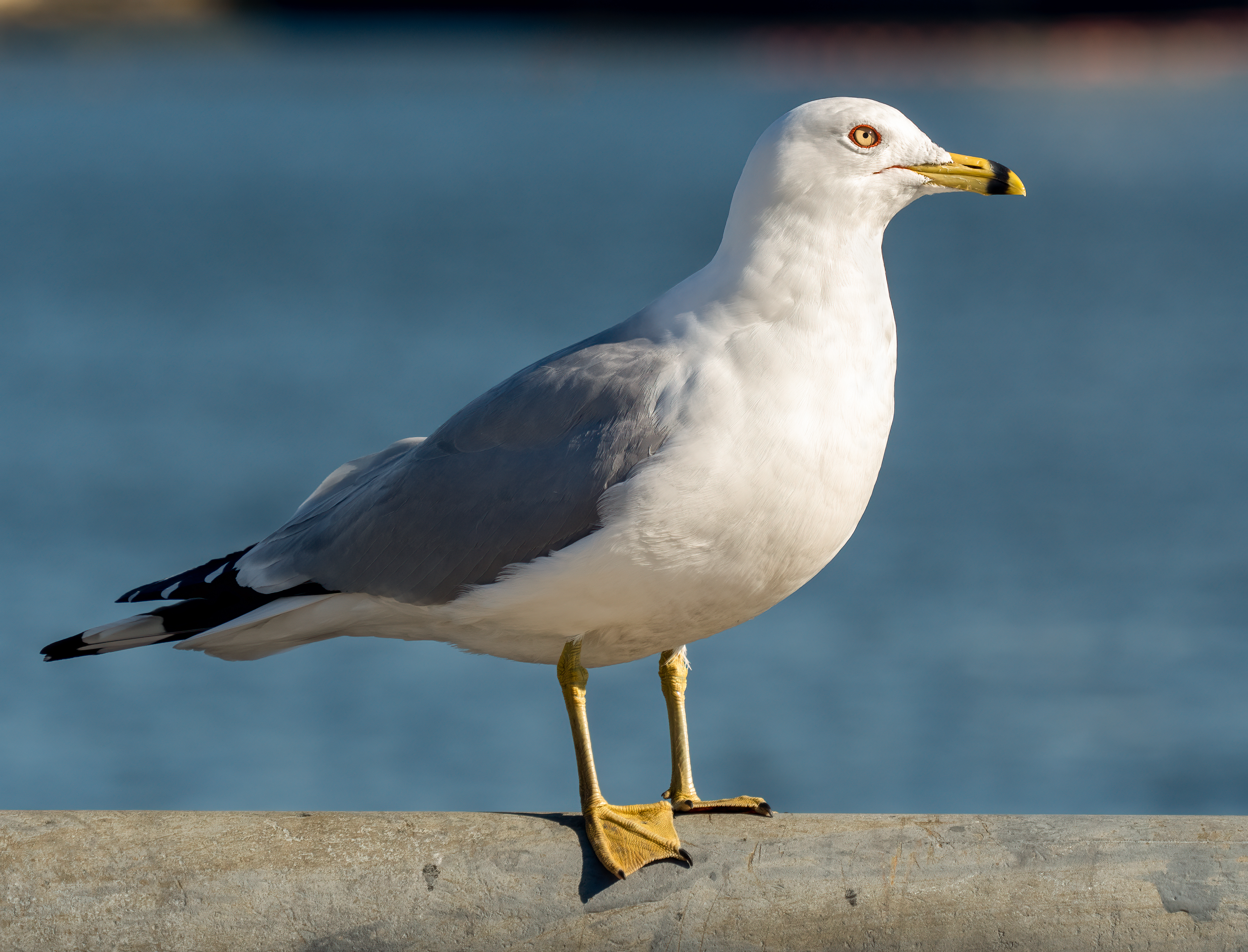
Ring-billed gull in Red Hook, Brooklyn

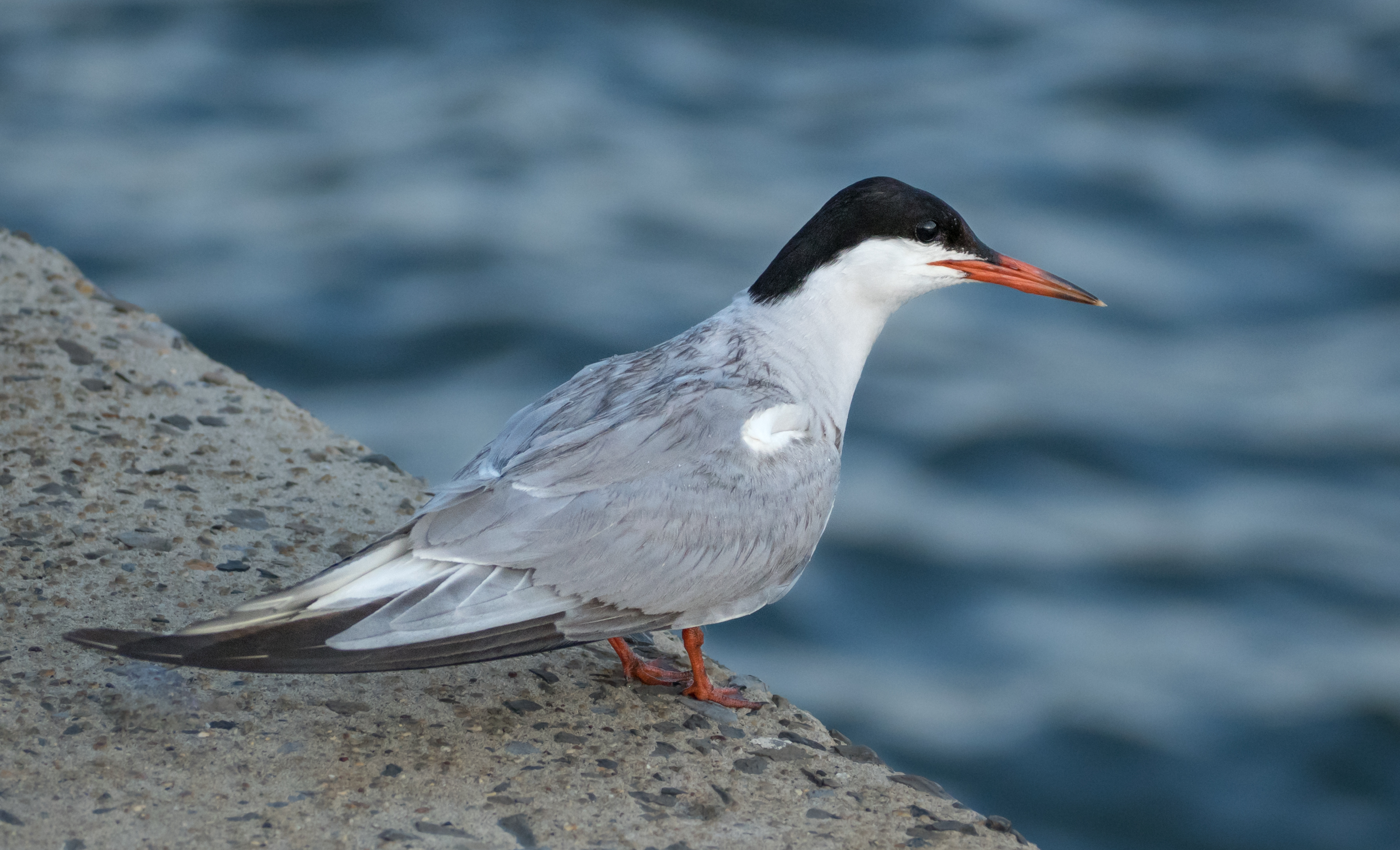
Common tern in Brooklyn Bridge Park

Order: Charadriiformes Family: Laridae

Laridae is a family of medium to large seabirds and includes jaegers, skuas, gulls, terns, kittiwakes, and skimmers. They are typically gray or white, often with black markings on the head or wings. They have stout, longish bills and webbed feet. Thirty-six species have been recorded in New York.

- Black-legged kittiwake, Rissa tridactyla
- Ivory gull, Pagophila eburnea (N)
- Sabine's gull, Xema sabini (S)(D)
- Bonaparte's gull, Chroicocephalus philadelphia
- Gray-hooded gull, Chroicocephalus cirrocephalus (N)
- Black-headed gull, Chroicocephalus ridibundus
- Little gull, Hydrocoloeus minutus
- Ross's gull, Rhodostethia rosea (N)
- Laughing gull, Leucophaeus atricilla (B)
- Franklin's gull, Leucophaeus pipixcan (D)
- Black-tailed gull, Larus crassirostris (N)
- Common gull/short-billed gull, Larus canus/Larus brachyrhynchus (N) (Note: The NYSARC list contains mew gull, which the AOS has split.)
- Ring-billed gull, Larus delawarensis (B)
- Western gull, Larus occidentalis (N)
- California gull, Larus californicus (N)
- Herring gull, Larus smithsonianus (B)
- Iceland gull, Larus glaucoides
- Lesser black-backed gull, Larus fuscus
- Slaty-backed gull, Larus schistisagus (N)
- Glaucous gull, Larus hyperboreus
- Great black-backed gull, Larus marinus (B)
- Sooty tern, Onychoprion fuscatus (N)
- Bridled tern, Onychoprion anaethetus (N)
- Least tern, Sternula antillarum (U)(B)
- Gull-billed tern, Gelochelidon nilotica (U)(B)
- Caspian tern, Hydroprogne caspia (B)
- Black tern, Chlidonias niger (B)
- White-winged tern, Chlidonias leucopterus (N)(B)
- Roseate tern, Sterna dougallii (U)(B)
- Common tern, Sterna hirundo (B)
- Arctic tern, Sterna paradisaea (N, excluding Cupsogue Beach County Park)
- Forster's tern, Sterna forsteri (B)
- Royal tern, Thalasseus maximus (U)
- Sandwich tern, Thalasseus sandvicensis (N)
- Elegant tern, Thalasseus elegans (N)
- Black skimmer, Rynchops niger (U)(B)

== Tropicbirds ==
Order: Phaethontiformes Family: Phaethontidae

Tropicbirds are slender white birds of tropical oceans with exceptionally long central tail feathers. Their long wings have black markings, as does the head. Two species have been recorded in New York.

- White-tailed tropicbird, Phaethon lepturus (N)
- Red-billed tropicbird, Phaethon aethereus (N)

== Loons ==
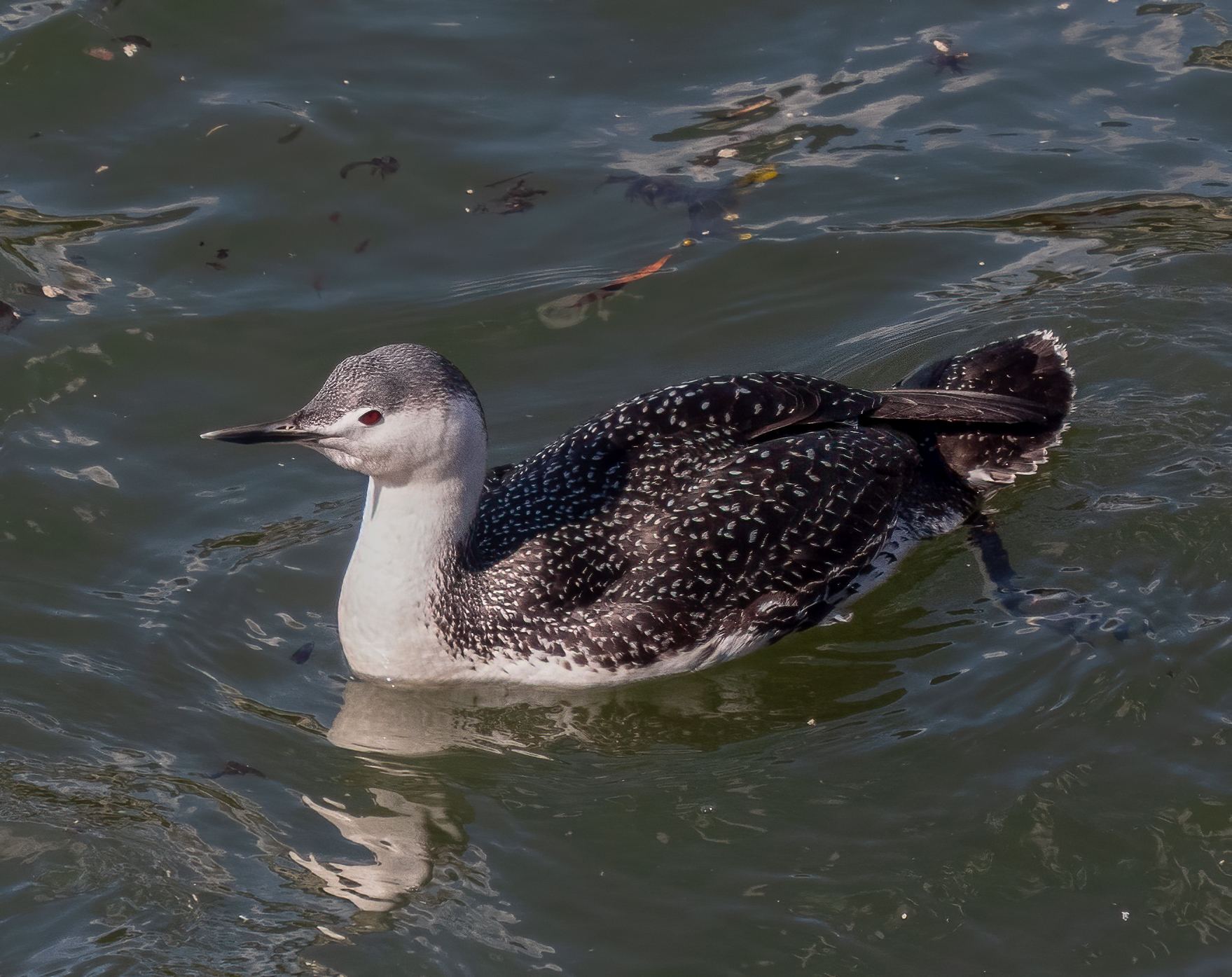
Red-throated loon in Red Hook, Brooklyn

Order: Gaviiformes Family: Gaviidae

Loons are aquatic birds the size of large ducks, which they superficially resemble. Their plumage is largely gray or black, and they have spear-shaped bills. Loons swim well and fly adequately, but, because their legs are placed towards the rear of the body, are not well adapted to locomotion on land. Four species have been recorded in New York.

- Red-throated loon, Gavia stellata
- Pacific loon, Gavia pacifica (N)
- Common loon, Gavia immer (B)
- Yellow-billed loon, Gavia adamsii (N)

== Albatrosses ==
Order: Procellariiformes Family: Diomedeidae

The albatrosses are among the largest of flying birds, and the great albatrosses from the genus Diomedea have the largest wingspans of any extant birds. One species has appeared in New York.

- Yellow-nosed albatross, Thalassarche chlororhynchos (N)

== Southern storm-petrels ==
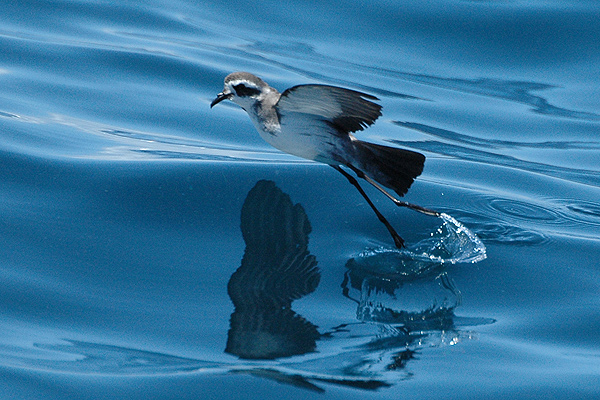
White-faced storm-petrel

Order: Procellariiformes Family: Oceanitidae

The storm-petrels are the smallest seabirds, relatives of the petrels, feeding on planktonic crustaceans and small fish picked from the surface, typically while hovering. The flight is fluttering and sometimes bat-like. Until 2018, the family's three species were included with the other storm-petrels in family Hydrobatidae. Two species have been recorded in New York.

- Wilson's storm-petrel, Oceanites oceanicus (U)
- White-faced storm-petrel, Pelagodroma marina (N)

== Northern storm-petrels ==
Order: Procellariiformes Family: Hydrobatidae

Though the members of this family are similar in many respects to the southern storm-petrels, including their general appearance and habits, there are enough genetic differences to warrant their placement in a separate family. Two species have been recorded in New York.

- Leach's storm-petrel, Hydrobates leucorhous (P)
- Band-rumped storm-petrel, Hydrobates castro (N)

== Shearwaters and petrels ==
Order: Procellariiformes Family: Procellariidae

The procellariids are the main group of medium-sized "true petrels", characterized by united nostrils with medium septum and a long outer functional primary. Ten species have been recorded in New York.

- Northern fulmar, Fulmarus glacialis (U)
- Trindade petrel, Pterodroma arminjoniana (N)
- Mottled petrel, Pterodroma inexpectata (N)
- Black-capped petrel, Pterodroma hasitata (N)
- Fea's petrel, Pterodroma feae (N)
- Cory's shearwater, Calonectris diomedea (U)
- Sooty shearwater, Ardenna griseus (U)
- Great shearwater, Ardenna gravis (U)
- Manx shearwater, Puffinus puffinus (U)
- Sargasso shearwater, Puffinus lherminieri (P)

== Storks ==
Order: Ciconiiformes Family: Ciconiidae

Storks are large, heavy, long-legged, long-necked wading birds with long stout bills and wide wingspans. They lack the powder down that other wading birds such as herons, spoonbills, and ibises use to clean off fish slime. Storks lack a pharynx and are mute. One species has been recorded in New York.

- Wood stork, Mycteria americana (N)

== Frigatebirds ==
Order: Suliformes Family: Fregatidae

Frigatebirds are large seabirds usually found over tropical oceans. They are large, black, or black-and-white, with long wings and deeply forked tails. The males have colored inflatable throat pouches. They do not swim or walk and cannot take off from a flat surface. Having the largest wingspan-to-weight ratio of any bird, they are essentially aerial, able to stay aloft for more than a week. One species has been recorded in New York.

- Magnificent frigatebird, Fregata magnificens (N)

== Boobies and gannets ==
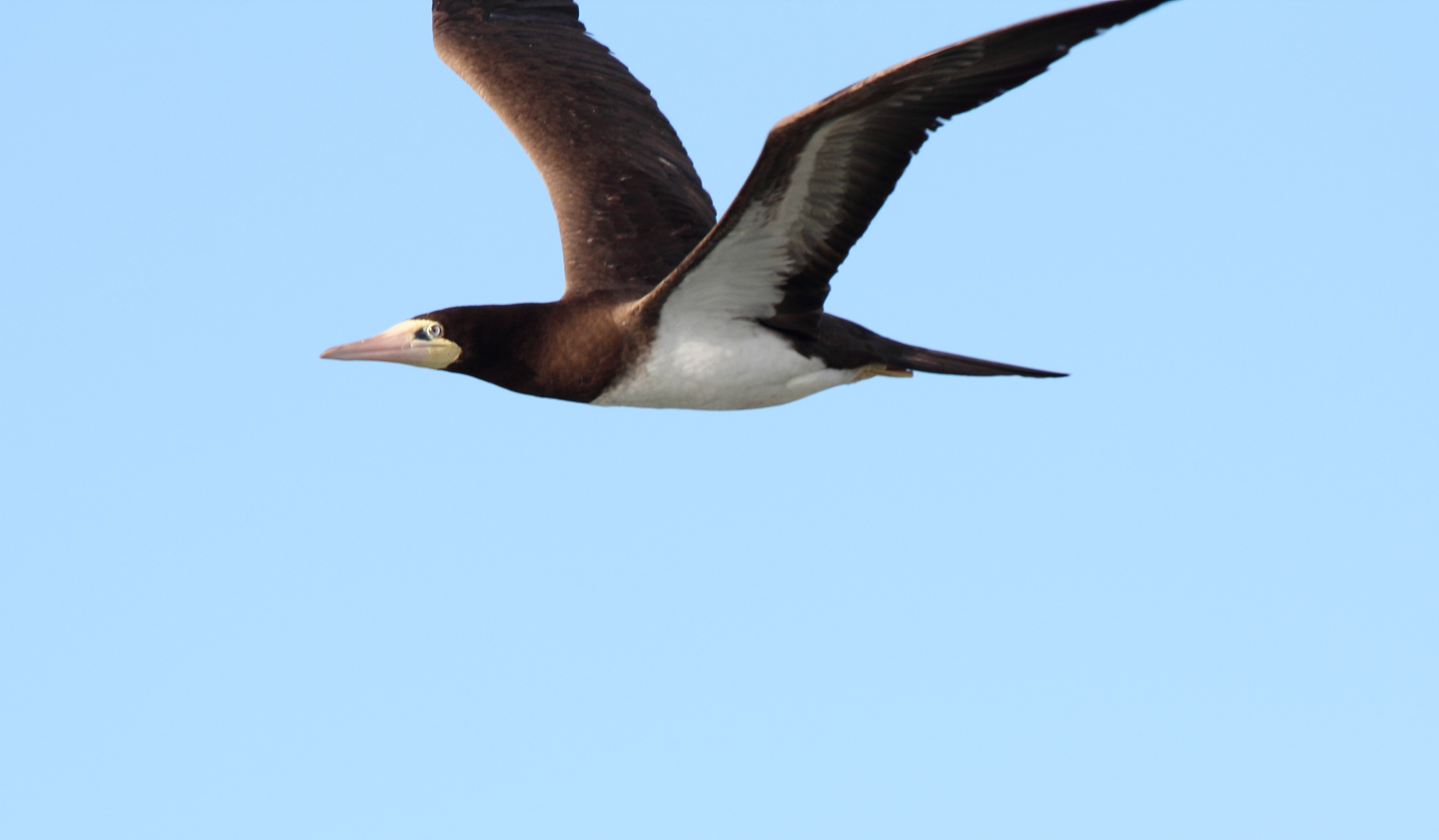
Brown booby at Buffalo Harbor State Park

Order: Suliformes Family: Sulidae

The sulids comprise the gannets and boobies. Both groups are medium-large coastal seabirds that plunge-dive for fish. Three species have been recorded in New York.

- Brown booby, Sula leucogaster (N)
- Red-footed booby, Sula sula (accidental)
- Northern gannet, Morus bassanus

== Anhingas ==
Order: Suliformes Family: Anhingidae

Anhingas are cormorant-like water birds with very long necks and long, straight beaks. They are fish eaters which often swim with only their neck above the water. One species has been recorded in New York.

- Anhinga, Anhinga anhinga (N)

== Cormorants and shags ==
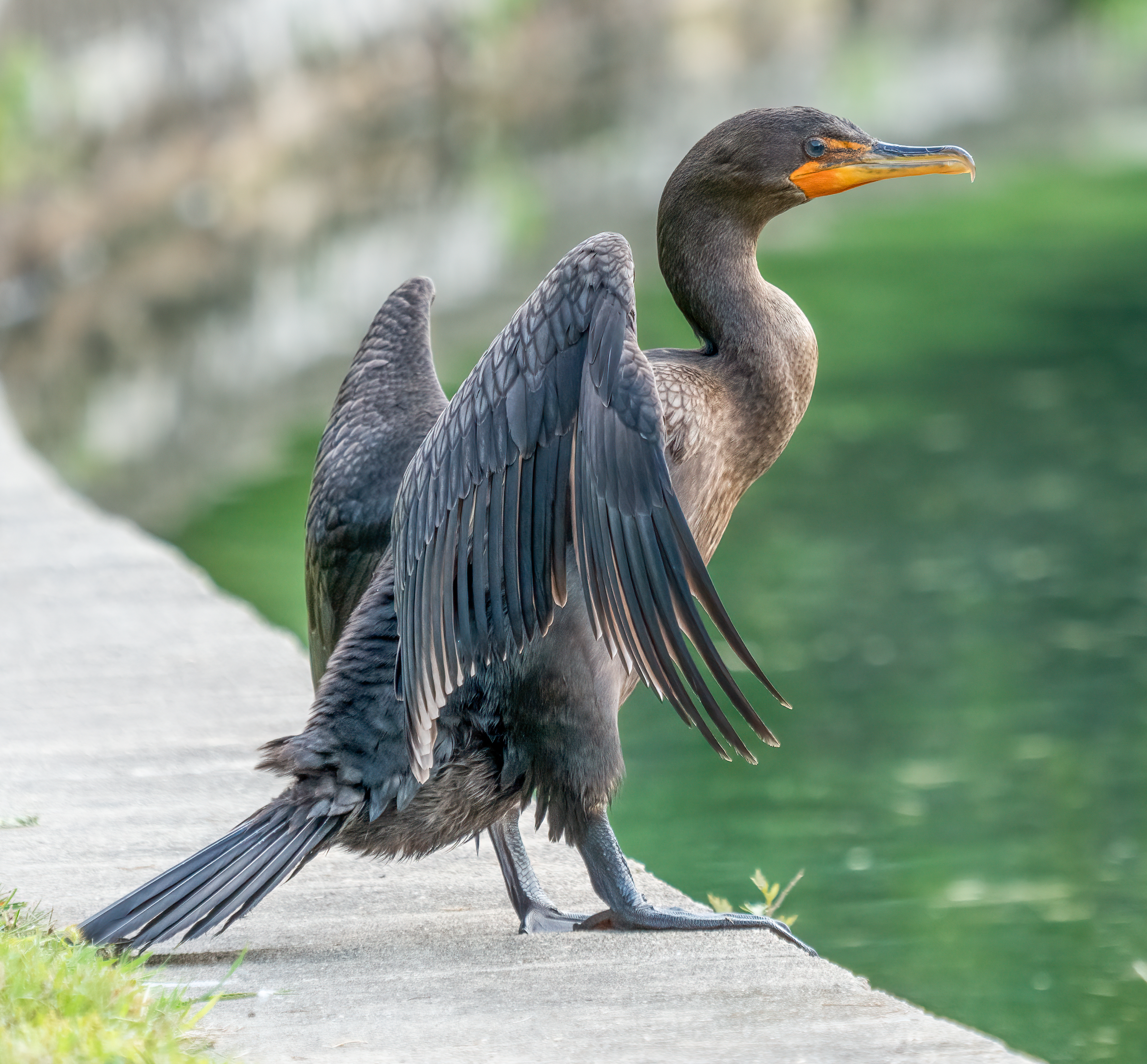
Double-crested cormorant in Brooklyn, New York

Order: Suliformes Family: Phalacrocoracidae

Cormorants are medium to large aquatic birds, usually with mainly dark plumage and areas of colored skin on the face. The bill is long, thin, and sharply hooked. Their feet are four-toed and webbed. Three species have been recorded in New York.

- Great cormorant, Phalacrocorax carbo
- Double-crested cormorant, Nannopterum auritum (B)
- Neotropic cormorant, Nannopterum brasilianum (N)

== Pelicans ==
Order: Pelecaniformes Family: Pelecanidae

Pelicans are very large water birds with a distinctive pouch under their beak. Like other birds in the order Pelecaniformes, they have four webbed toes. Two species have been recorded in New York.

- American white pelican, Pelecanus erythrorhynchos
- Brown pelican, Pelecanus occidentalis (U)

== Herons, egrets, and bitterns ==
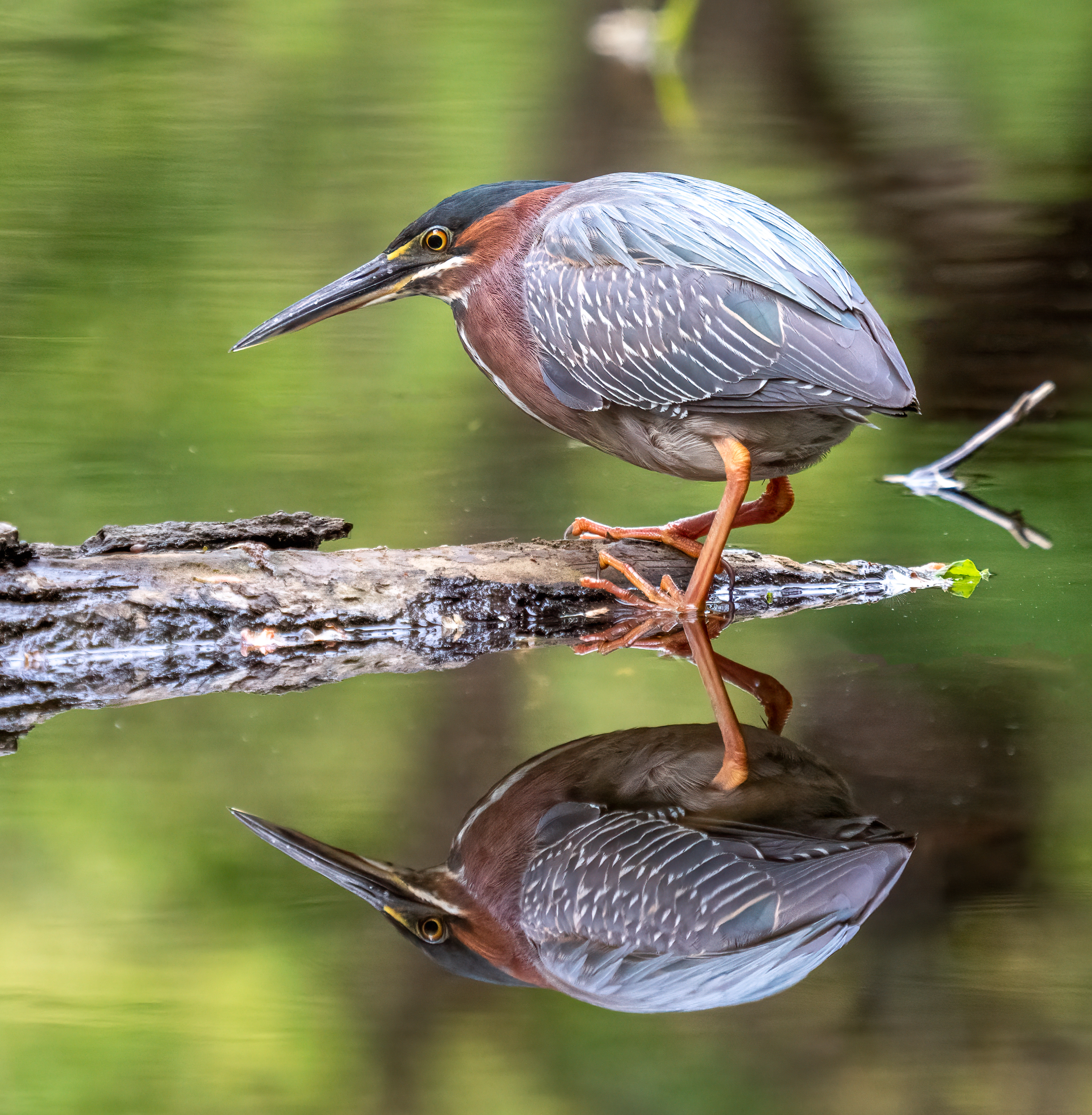
Green heron at the Prospect Park Lake

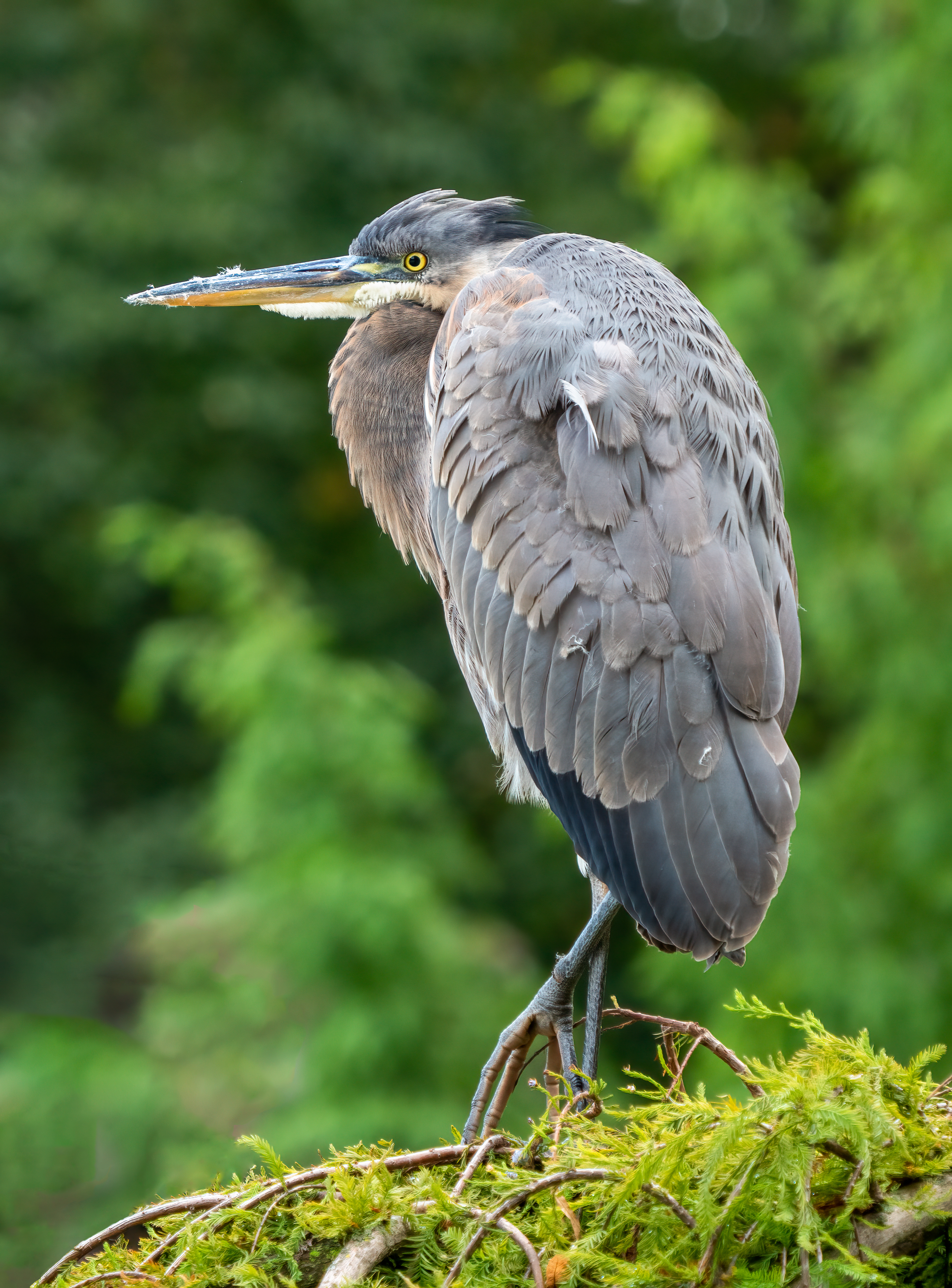
Great blue heron in Green-Wood Cemetery

Order: Pelecaniformes Family: Ardeidae

The family Ardeidae contains the herons, egrets, and bitterns. Herons and egrets are medium-sized to large wading birds with long necks and legs. Bitterns tend to be shorter-necked and more secretive. Members of Ardeidae fly with their necks retracted, unlike other long-necked birds such as storks, ibises and spoonbills. Fourteen species have been recorded in New York.

- American bittern, Botaurus lentiginosus (B)
- Least bittern, Ixobrychus exilis (B)
- Great blue heron, Ardea herodias (B)
- Great egret, Ardea alba (B)
- Little egret, Egretta garzetta (N)
- Western reef-heron, Egretta gularis (N)
- Snowy egret, Egretta thula (B)
- Little blue heron, Egretta caerulea (B)
- Tricolored heron, Egretta tricolor (U)(B)
- Reddish egret, Egretta rufescens (N)
- Cattle egret, Bubulcus ibis (B)
- Green heron, Butorides virescens (B)
- Black-crowned night-heron, Nycticorax nycticorax (B)
- Yellow-crowned night-heron, Nyctanassa violacea (B)

== Ibises and spoonbills ==
Order: Pelecaniformes Family: Threskiornithidae

The family Threskiornithidae includes the ibises and spoonbills. They have long, broad wings. Their bodies tend to be elongated, the neck more so, with rather long legs. The bill is also long, decurved in the case of the ibises, straight and distinctively flattened in the spoonbills. Four species have been recorded in New York.

- White ibis, Eudocimus albus (N)
- Glossy ibis, Plegadis falcinellus (B)
- White-faced ibis, Plegadis chihi (N)
- Roseate spoonbill, Platalea ajaja (N)

== New World vultures ==
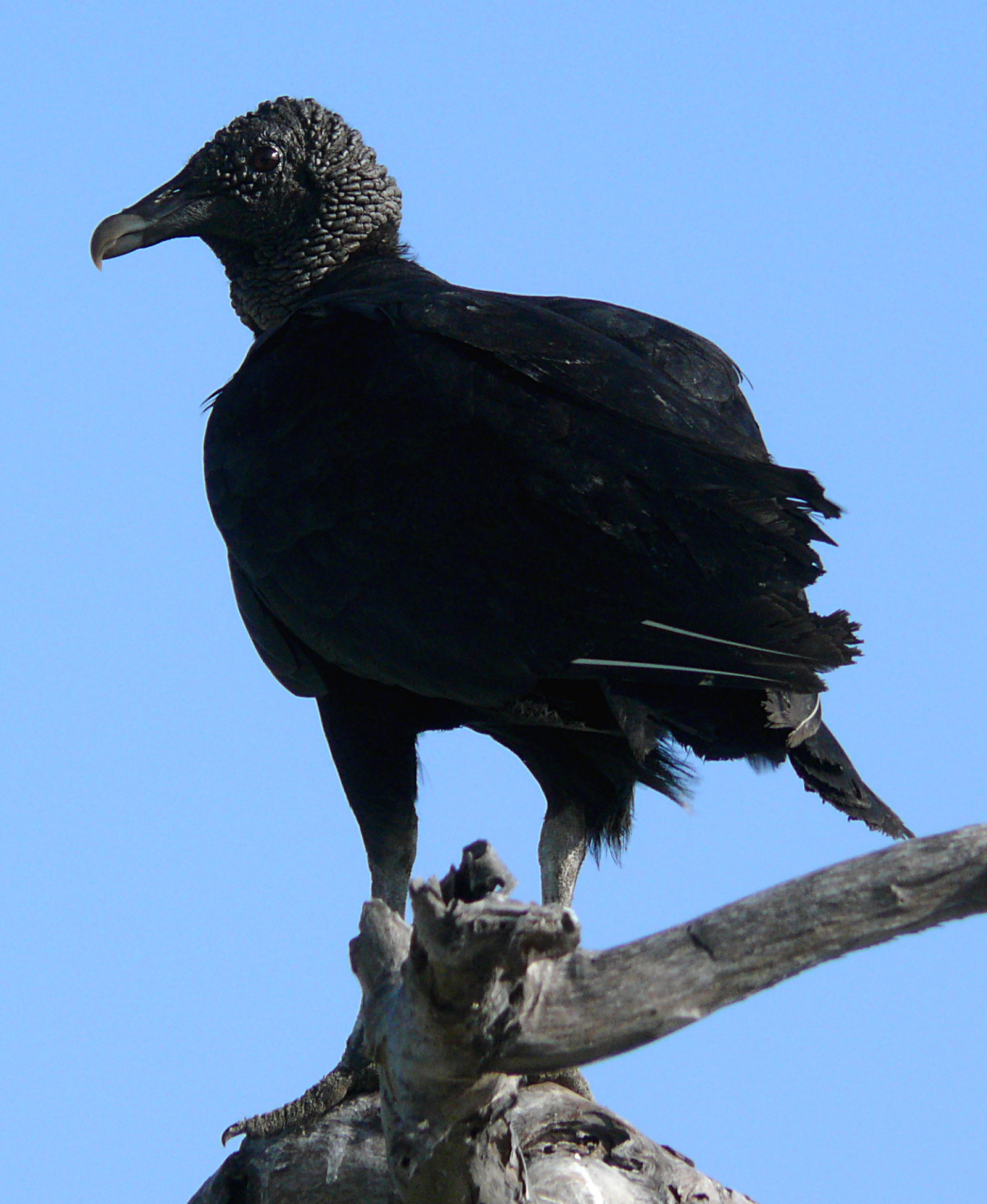
Black vulture

Order: Cathartiformes Family: Cathartidae

The New World vultures are not closely related to Old World vultures, but superficially resemble them because of convergent evolution. Like the Old World vultures, they are scavengers, but unlike Old World vultures, which find carcasses by sight, some New World vultures have a good sense of smell with which they find carcasses. Two species have been recorded in New York.

- Black vulture, Coragyps atratus (B)
- Turkey vulture, Cathartes aura (B)

== Osprey ==
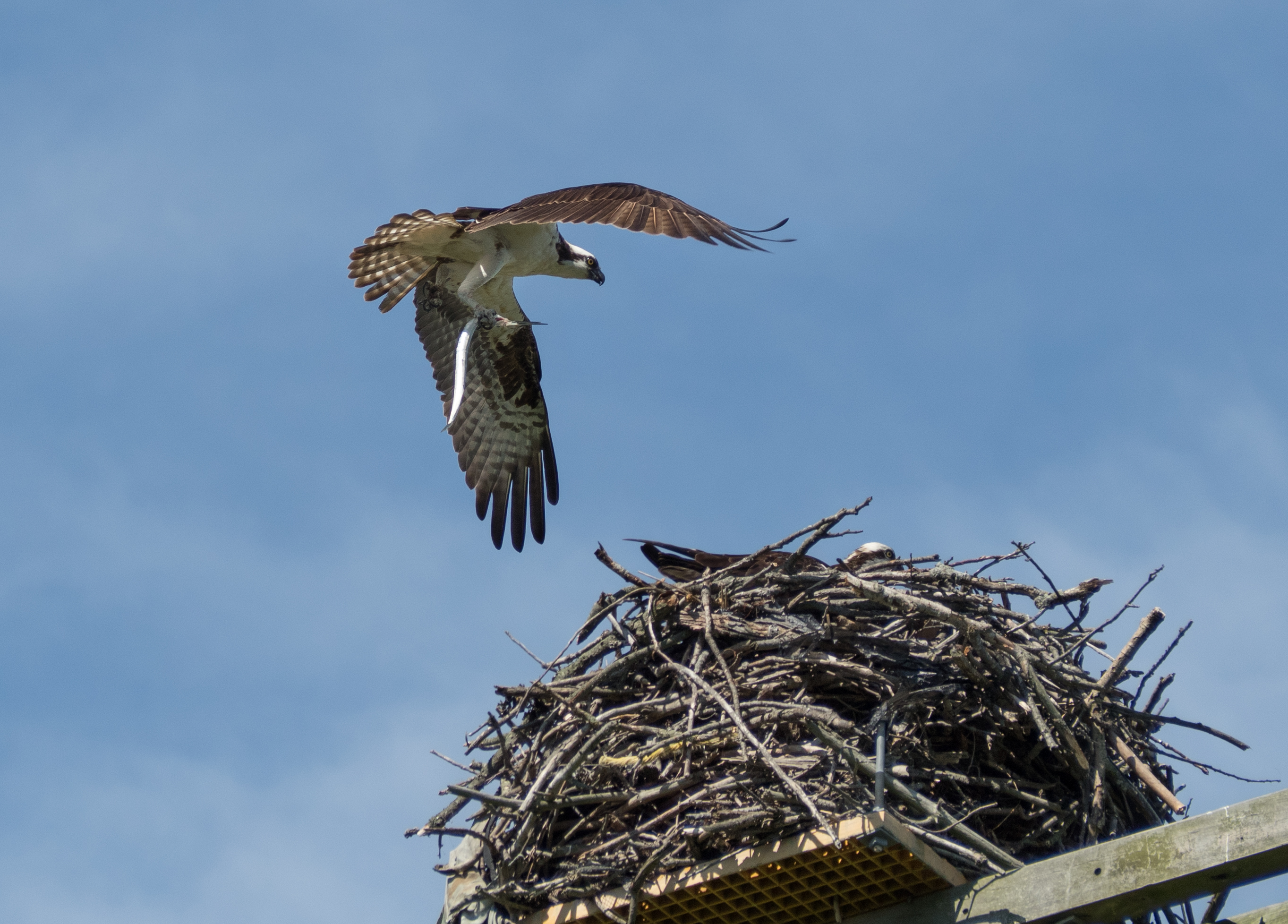
Osprey bringing a needlefish back to its nest in the Jamaica Bay Wildlife Refuge

Order: Accipitriformes Family: Pandionidae

Pandionidae is a monotypic family of fish-eating birds of prey, possessing a very large, powerful hooked beak for tearing flesh from their prey, strong legs, powerful talons, and keen eyesight.

- Osprey, Pandion haliaetus (B)

== Hawks, eagles, and kites ==
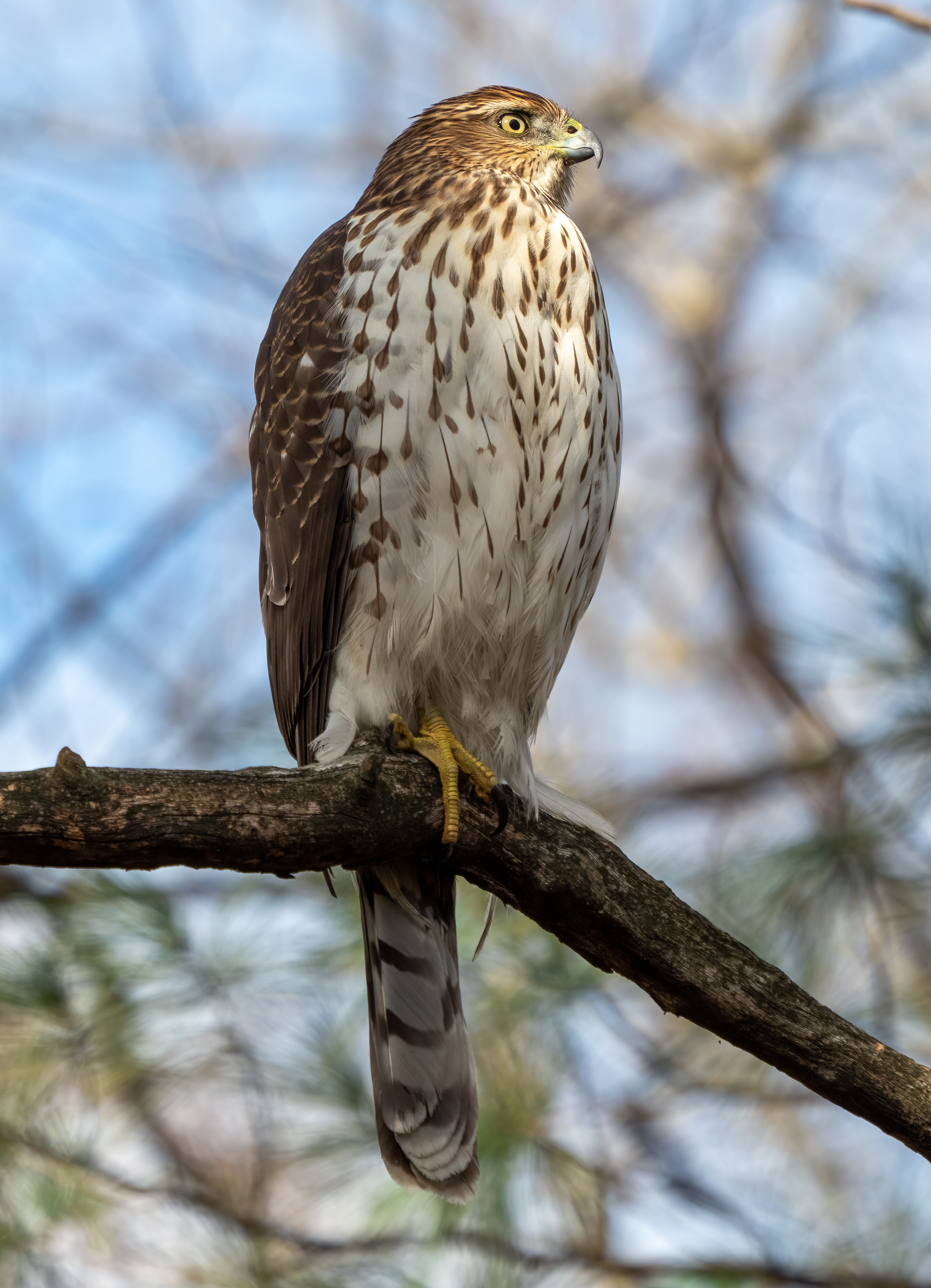
Juvenile Cooper's hawk in Prospect Park, Brooklyn

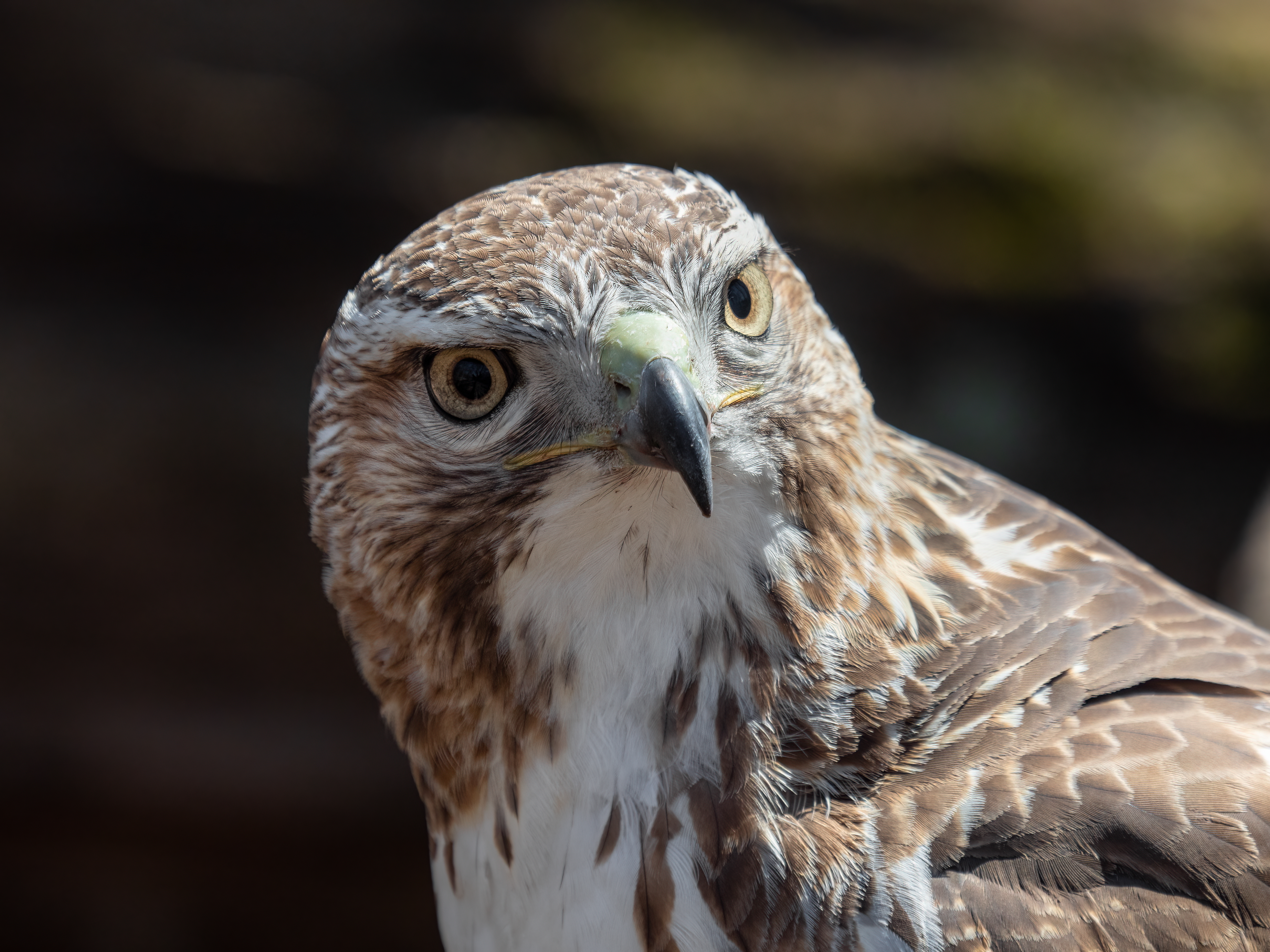
Red-tailed hawk in Central Park

Order: Accipitriformes Family: Accipitridae

Accipitridae is a family of birds of prey which includes hawks, eagles, kites, and harriers. These birds have very large powerful hooked beaks for tearing flesh from their prey, strong legs, powerful talons, and keen eyesight. Sixteen species have been recorded in New York.

- White-tailed kite, Elanus leucurus (N)
- Swallow-tailed kite, Elanoides forficatus (N)
- Golden eagle, Aquila chrysaetos (B)
- Northern harrier, Circus hudsonius (B)
- Sharp-shinned hawk, Accipiter striatus (B)
- Cooper's hawk, Accipiter cooperii (B)
- American goshawk, Accipiter atricapillus (B)
- Bald eagle, Haliaeetus leucocephalus (B)
- Mississippi kite, Ictinia mississippiensis (N)(B)
- Roadside hawk, Rupornis magnirostris (accidental)
- Red-shouldered hawk, Buteo lineatus (B)
- Broad-winged hawk, Buteo platypterus (B)
- Swainson's hawk, Buteo swainsoni (N)
- Red-tailed hawk, Buteo jamaicensis (B)
- Rough-legged hawk, Buteo lagopus
- Ferruginous hawk, Buteo regalis (N)

== Barn-owls ==
Order: Strigiformes Family: Tytonidae

Barn-owls are medium to large owls with large heads and characteristic heart-shaped faces. They have long strong legs with powerful talons. One species has been recorded in New York.

- Barn owl, Tyto furcata (B)

== Owls ==
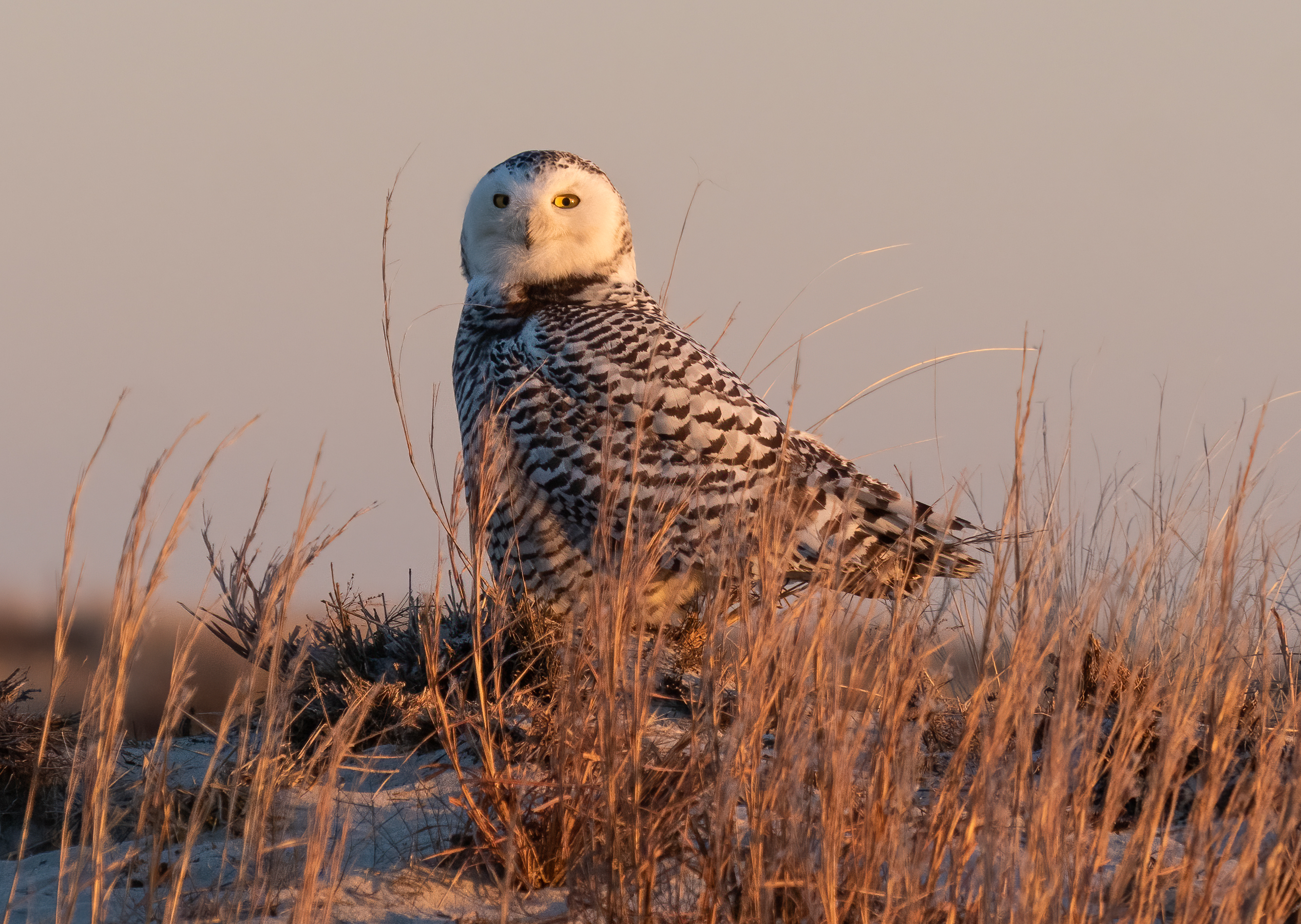
Snowy owl on Jones Beach

Order: Strigiformes Family: Strigidae

Typical owls are small to large solitary nocturnal birds of prey. They have large forward-facing eyes and ears, a hawk-like beak, and a conspicuous circle of feathers around each eye called a facial disk. Eleven species have been recorded in New York.

- Eastern screech-owl, Megascops asio (B)
- Great horned owl, Bubo virginianus (B)
- Snowy owl, Bubo scandiacus
- Northern hawk owl, Surnia ulula (N)
- Burrowing owl, Athene cunicularia (N)
- Barred owl, Strix varia (B)
- Great gray owl, Strix nebulosa (N)
- Long-eared owl, Asio otus (B)
- Short-eared owl, Asio flammeus (B)
- Boreal owl, Aegolius funereus (N)
- Northern saw-whet owl, Aegolius acadicus (B)

== Kingfishers ==
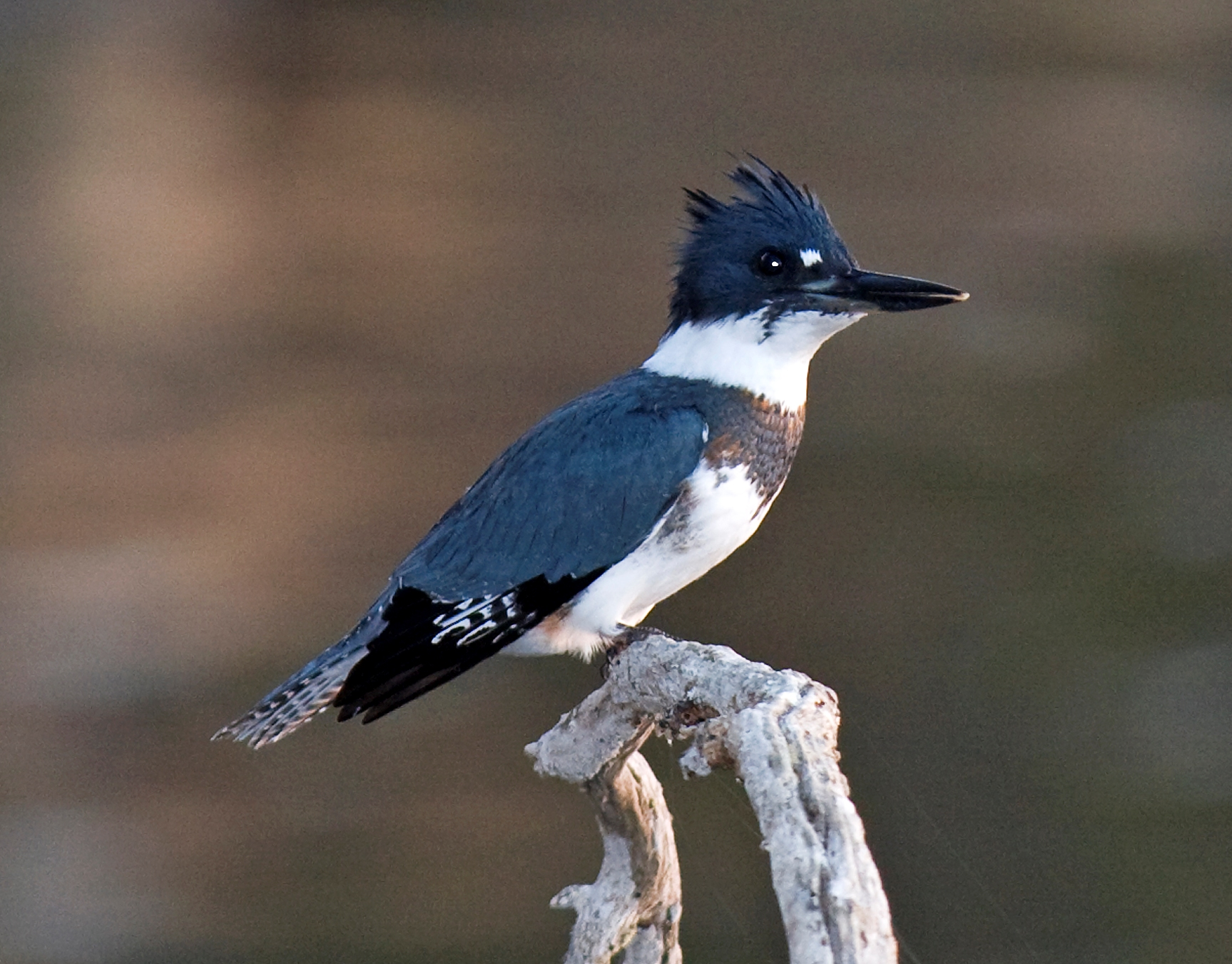
Belted kingfisher

Order: Coraciiformes Family: Alcedinidae

Kingfishers are medium-sized birds with large heads, long, pointed bills, short legs, and stubby tails. One species has been recorded in New York.

- Belted kingfisher, Megaceryle alcyon (B)

== Woodpeckers ==
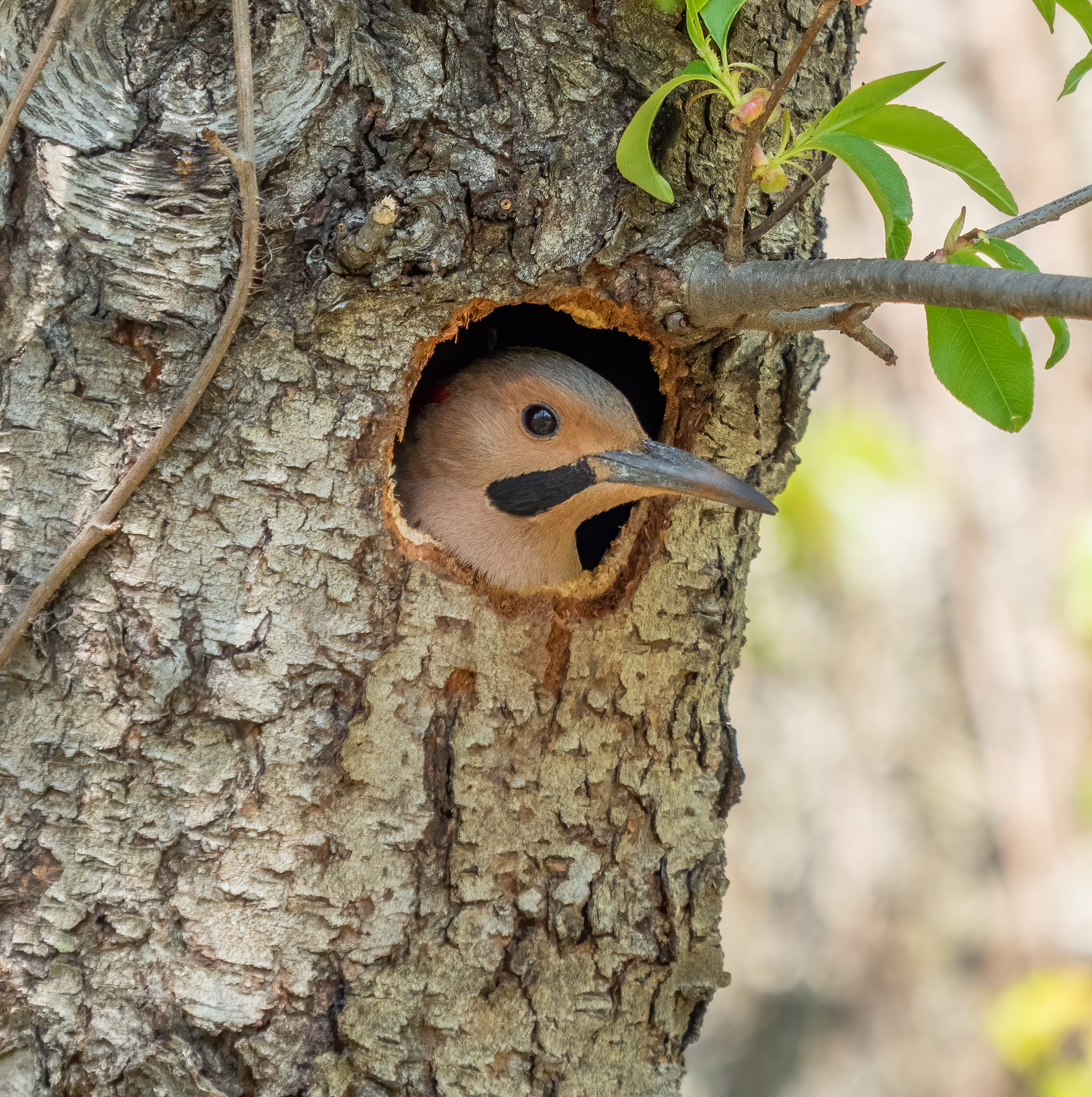
Northern flicker looks out from its nest in Central Park

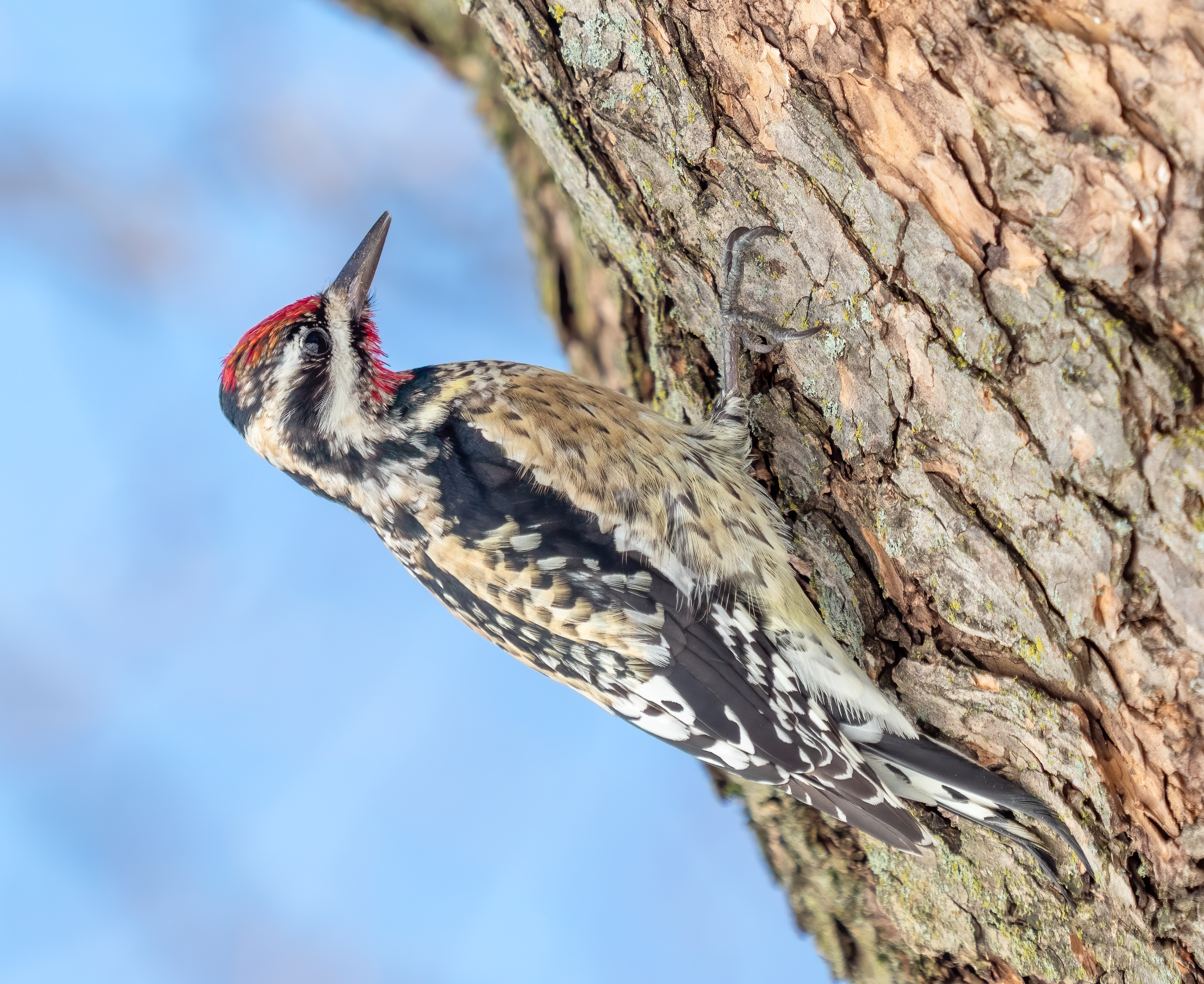
Yellow-bellied sapsucker on a tree in Central Park

Order: Piciformes Family: Picidae

Woodpeckers are small to medium-sized birds with chisel-like beaks, short legs, stiff tails, and long tongues used for capturing insects. Some species have feet with two toes pointing forward and two backward, while several species have only three toes. Many woodpeckers have the habit of tapping noisily on tree trunks with their beaks. Eleven species have been recorded in New York.

- Lewis's woodpecker, Melanerpes lewis (N)
- Red-headed woodpecker, Melanerpes erythrocephalus (B)
- Red-bellied woodpecker, Melanerpes carolinus (B)
- Williamson's sapsucker, Sphyrapicus thyroideus (N)
- Yellow-bellied sapsucker, Sphyrapicus varius (B)
- American three-toed woodpecker, Picoides dorsalis (N)(B)
- Black-backed woodpecker, Picoides arcticus (A)(B)
- Downy woodpecker, Dryobates pubescens (B)
- Hairy woodpecker, Dryobates villosus (B)
- Northern flicker, Colaptes auratus (B)
- Pileated woodpecker, Dryocopus pileatus (B)

== Falcons and caracaras ==
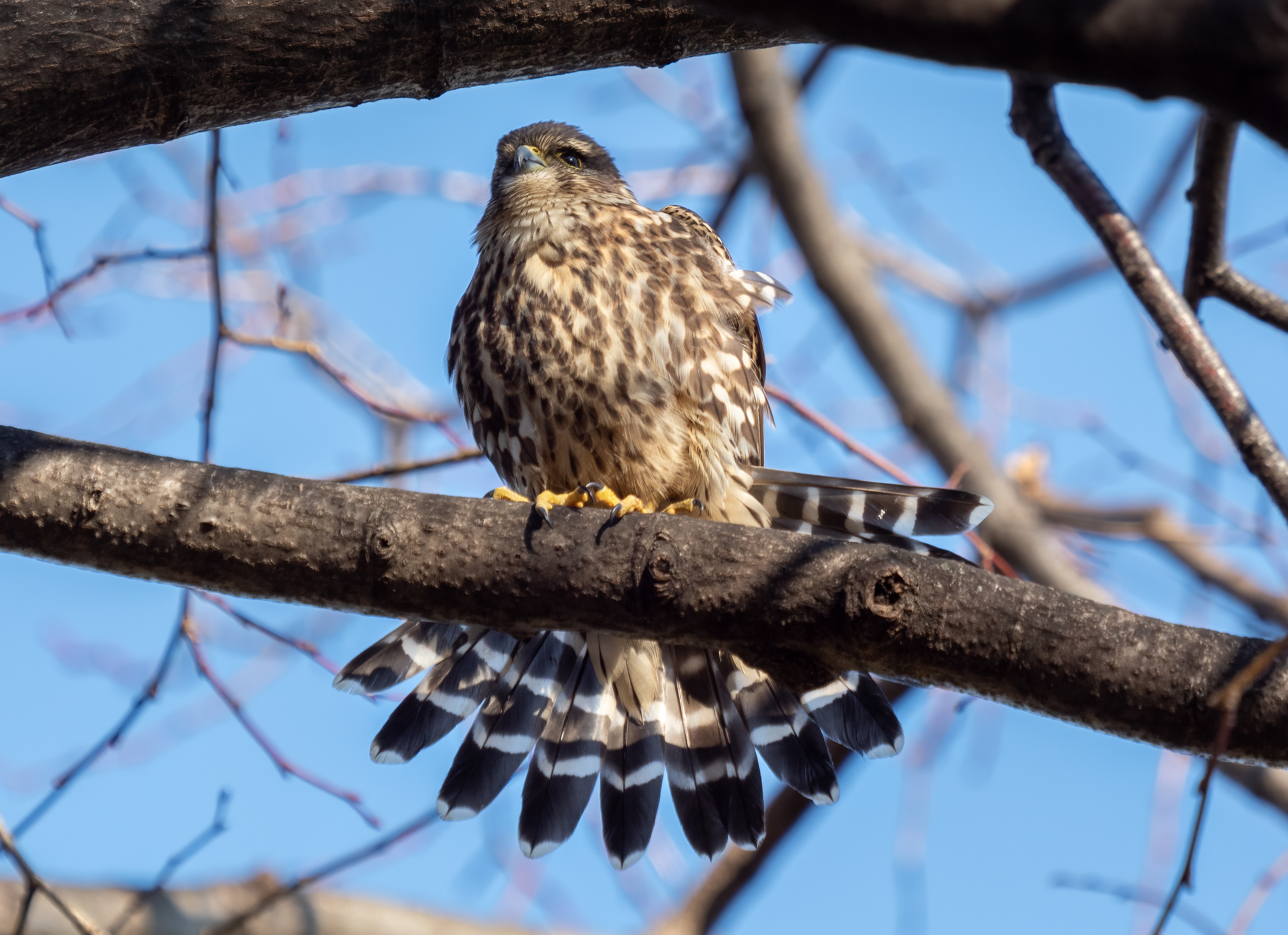
A merlin fanning its tail in Prospect Park

Order: Falconiformes Family: Falconidae

Falconidae is a family of diurnal birds of prey, notably the falcons and caracaras. They differ from hawks, eagles, and kites in that they kill with their beaks instead of their talons. Six species have been recorded in New York.

- Crested caracara, Caracara plancus (N)
- American kestrel, Falco sparverius (B)
- Merlin, Falco columbarius (B)
- Eurasian hobby, Falco subbuteo (accidental)
- Gyrfalcon, Falco rusticolus (N)
- Peregrine falcon, Falco peregrinus (B)

== New World and African parrots ==
Order: Psittaciformes Family: Psittacidae

Parrots are small to large birds with a characteristic curved beak. Their upper mandibles have slight mobility in the joint with the skull and they have a generally erect stance. All parrots are zygodactyl, having the four toes on each foot placed two at the front and two to the back. Most of the more than 150 species in the family are found in the New World. One species has been definitively recorded in New York, and one other that is extinct may also have been recorded.

- Monk parakeet, Myiopsitta monachus (I)(B)
- Carolina parakeet, Conuropsis carolinensis (†)(H)

== Tyrant flycatchers ==
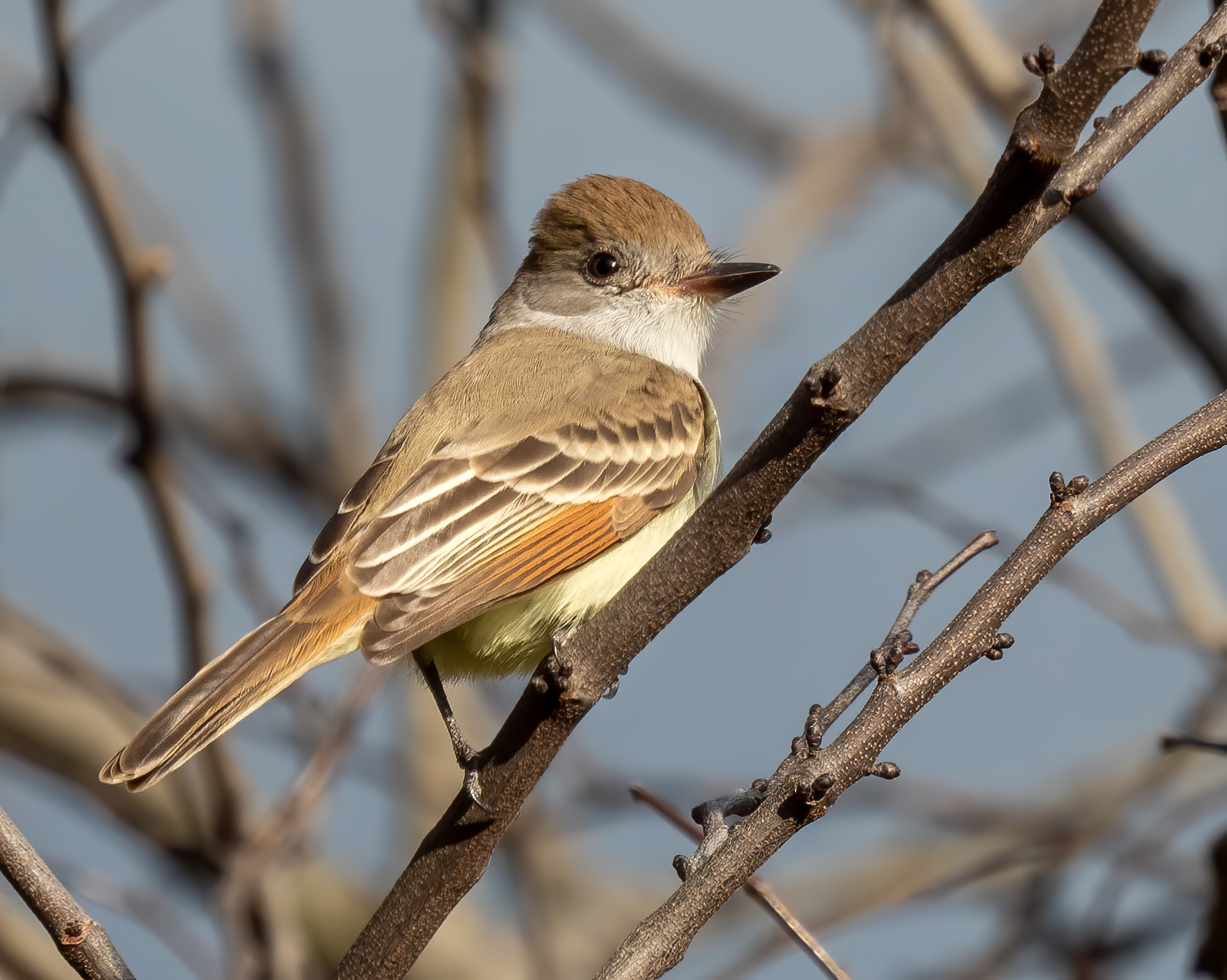
Ash-throated flycatcher in Green-Wood Cemetery

Order: Passeriformes Family: Tyrannidae

Tyrant flycatchers are passerines which are found throughout the Americas. They bear a superficially resemblance to the Old World flycatchers, but are more robust and have stronger bills. They lack the sophisticated vocal capabilities of the songbirds. Most are insectivorous. Twenty-two species have been recorded in New York.

- Ash-throated flycatcher, Myiarchus cinerascens (N)
- Great crested flycatcher, Myiarchus crinitus (B)
- Tropical kingbird, Tyrannus melancholicus (N)
- Couch's kingbird, Tyrannus couchii (N)
- Cassin's kingbird, Tyrannus vociferans (N)
- Western kingbird, Tyrannus verticalis (U)
- Eastern kingbird, Tyrannus tyrannus (B)
- Gray kingbird, Tyrannus dominicensis (N)
- Scissor-tailed flycatcher, Tyrannus forficatus (N)
- Fork-tailed flycatcher, Tyrannus savana (N)
- Olive-sided flycatcher, Contopus cooperi (B)
- Eastern wood-pewee, Contopus virens (B)
- Yellow-bellied flycatcher, Empidonax flaviventris (B)
- Acadian flycatcher, Empidonax virescens (B)
- Alder flycatcher, Empidonax alnorum (B)
- Willow flycatcher, Empidonax traillii (B)
- Least flycatcher, Empidonax minimus (B)
- Hammond's flycatcher, Empidonax hammondii (N)
- Western flycatcher, Empidonax difficilis (N)
- Eastern phoebe, Sayornis phoebe (B)
- Say's phoebe, Sayornis saya (N)
- Vermilion flycatcher, Pyrocephalus rubinus (N)

== Vireos, shrike-babblers, and erpornis ==
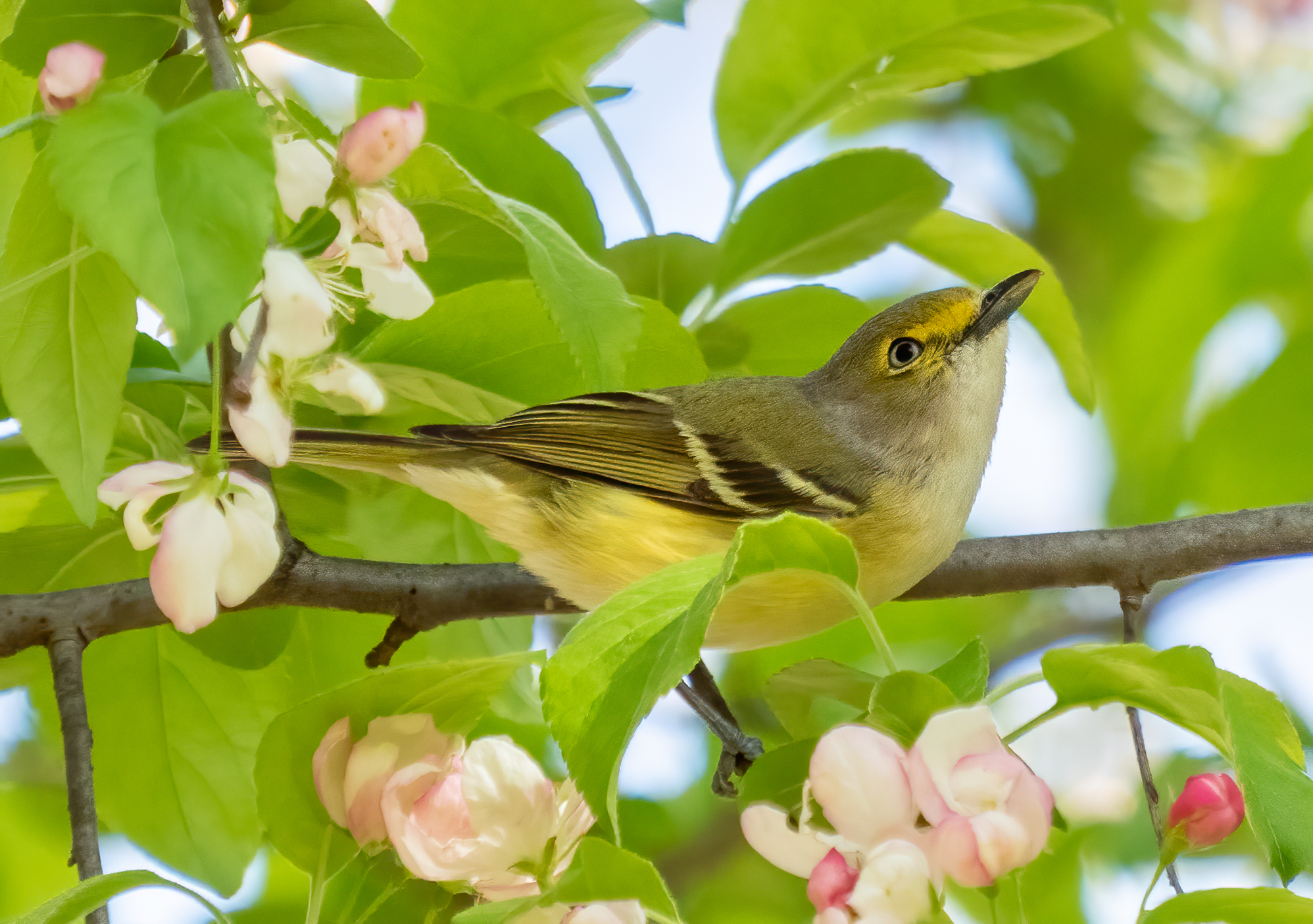
White-eyed vireo in Central Park

Order: Passeriformes Family: Vireonidae

The vireos are a group of small to medium-sized passerine birds mostly restricted to the New World, though other members of the family are found in Africa. They are typically greenish in color and resemble wood warblers apart from their heavier bills. Eight species have been recorded in New York.

- White-eyed vireo, Vireo griseus (B)
- Bell's vireo, Vireo bellii (N)
- Yellow-throated vireo, Vireo flavifrons (B)
- Cassin's vireo, Vireo cassinii (N)
- Blue-headed vireo, Vireo solitarius (B)
- Philadelphia vireo, Vireo philadelphicus (B)
- Warbling vireo, Vireo gilvus (B)
- Red-eyed vireo, Vireo olivaceus (B)

== Shrikes ==
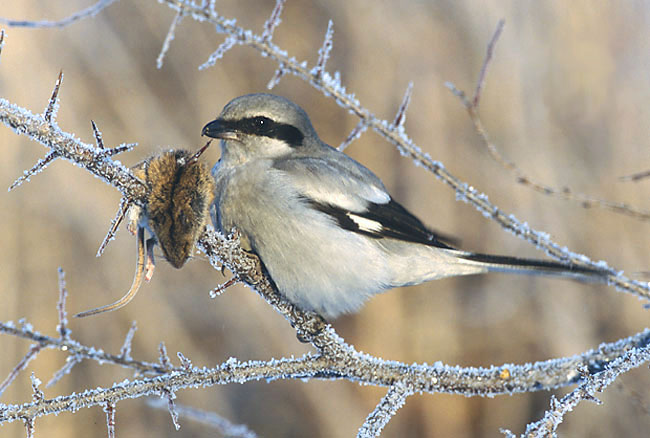
Northern shrike

Order: Passeriformes Family: Laniidae

Shrikes are passerine birds known for their habit of catching other birds and small animals and impaling the uneaten portions of their bodies on thorns. A shrike's beak is hooked, like that of a typical bird of prey. Two species have been recorded in New York.

- Loggerhead shrike, Lanius ludovicianus (N)(B)
- Northern shrike, Lanius borealis

== Crows, jays, and magpies ==
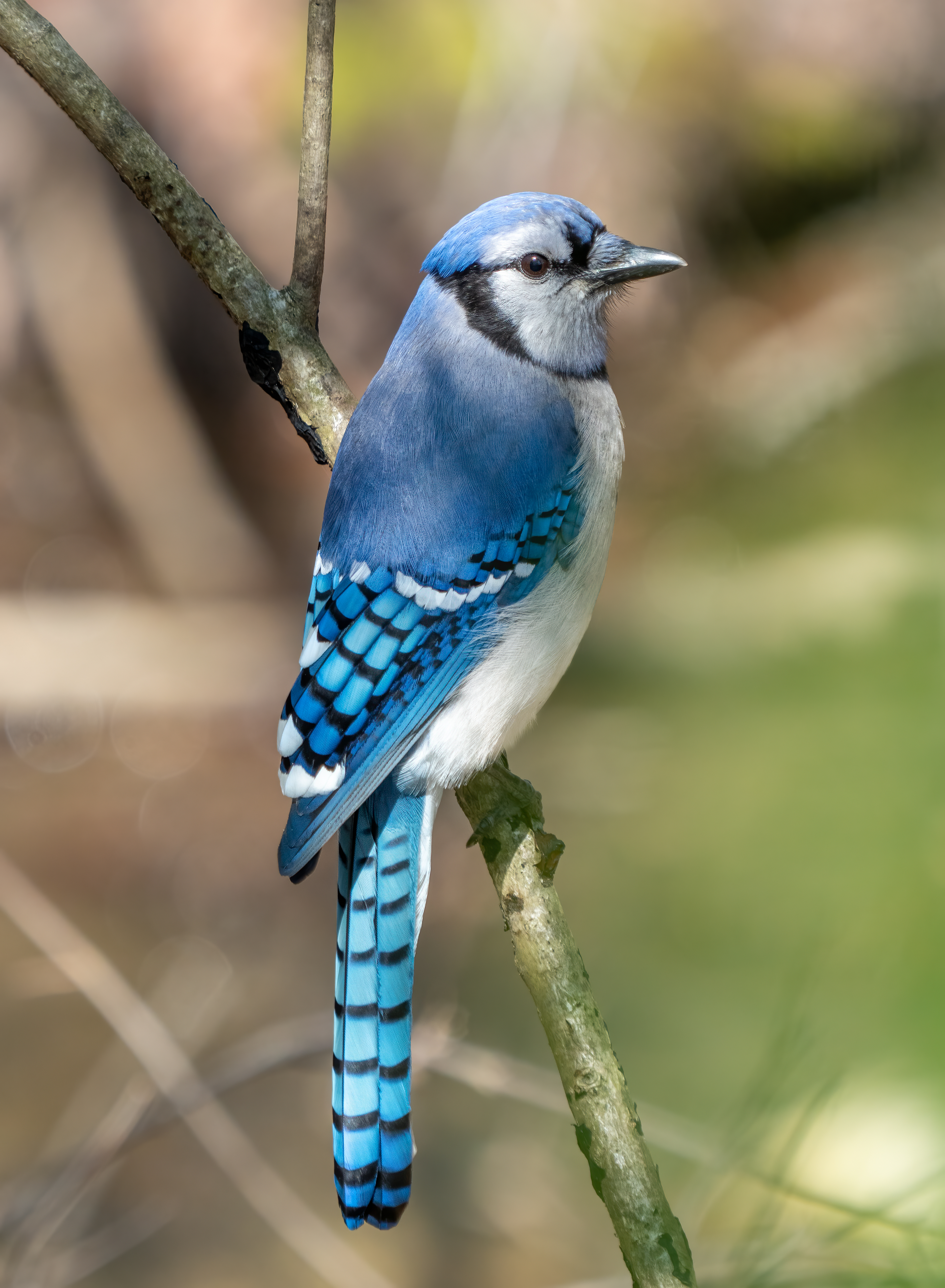
Blue jay in Prospect Park

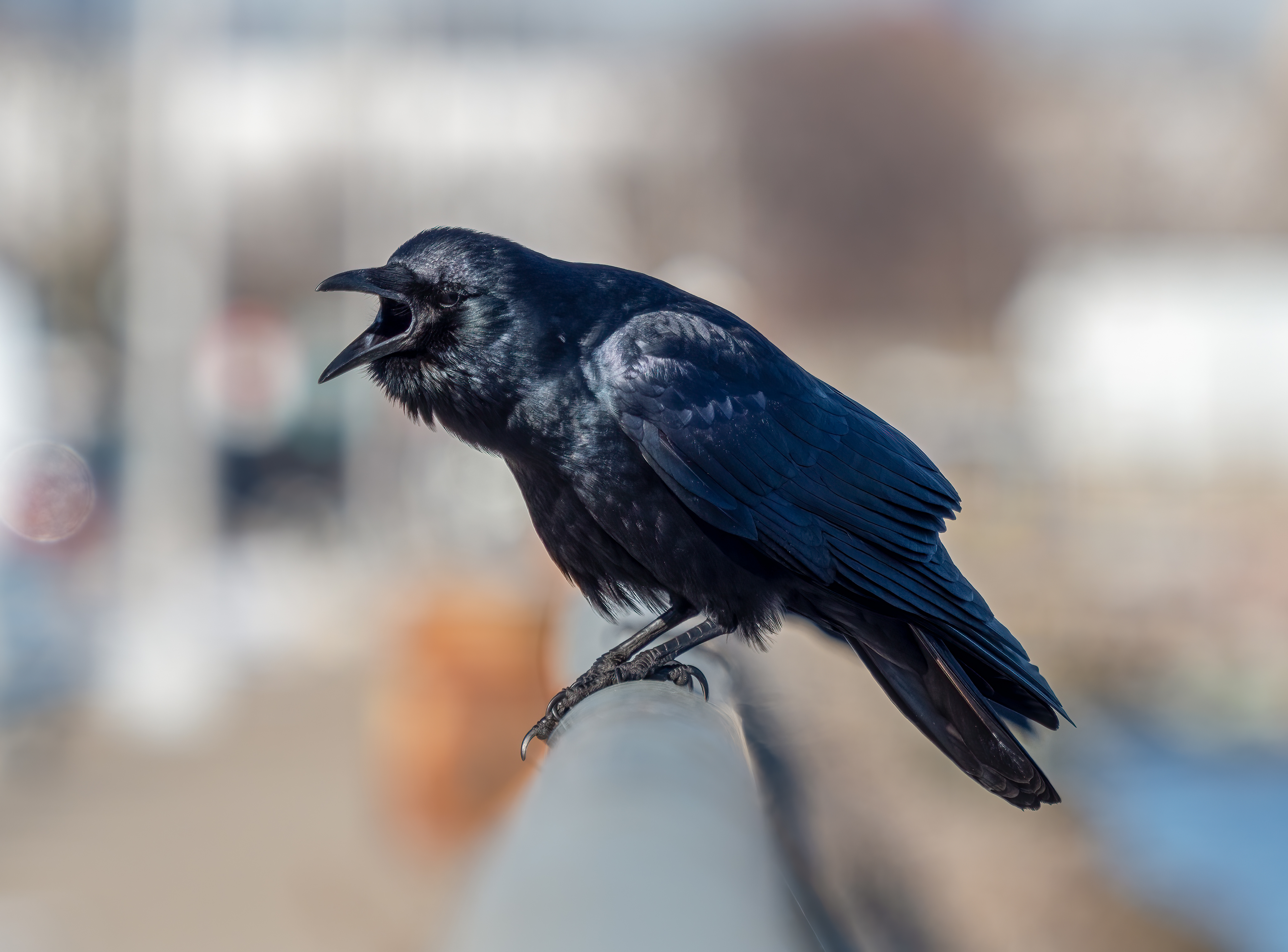
Fish crow in Red Hook, Brooklyn

Order: Passeriformes Family: Corvidae

The family Corvidae includes crows, ravens, jays, choughs, magpies, treepies, nutcrackers, and ground jays. Corvids are above average in size among the Passeriformes, and some of the larger species show high levels of intelligence. Six species have been recorded in New York.

- Canada jay, Perisoreus canadensis (A)(B)
- Blue jay, Cyanocitta cristata (B)
- Black-billed magpie, Pica hudsonia (N)
- American crow, Corvus brachyrhynchos (B)
- Fish crow, Corvus ossifragus (B)
- Common raven, Corvus corax (B)

== Tits, chickadees, and titmice ==
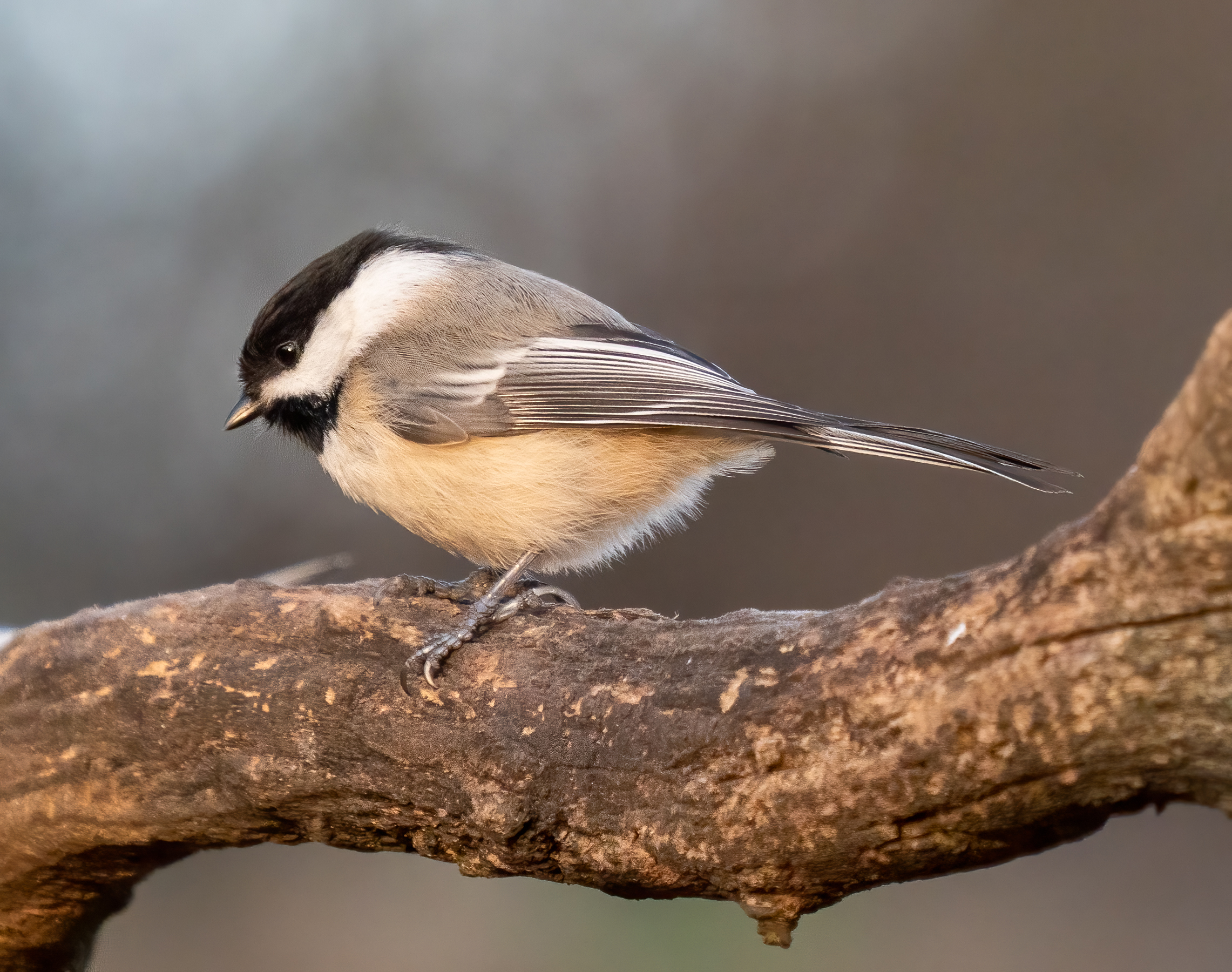
Black-capped chickadee in Green-Wood Cemetery

Order: Passeriformes Family: Paridae

The Paridae are mainly small stocky woodland species with short stout bills. Some have crests. They are adaptable birds, with a mixed diet including seeds and insects. Three species have been recorded in New York.

- Black-capped chickadee, Poecile atricapillus (B)
- Boreal chickadee, Poecile hudsonica (B)
- Tufted titmouse, Baeolophus bicolor (B)

== Larks ==
Order: Passeriformes Family: Alaudidae

Larks are small terrestrial birds with often extravagant songs and display flights. Most larks are fairly dull in appearance. Their food is insects and seeds. Two species have been recorded in New York.

- Eurasian skylark, Alauda arvensis (IE)(B)
- Horned lark, Eremophila alpestris (B)

== Swallows ==
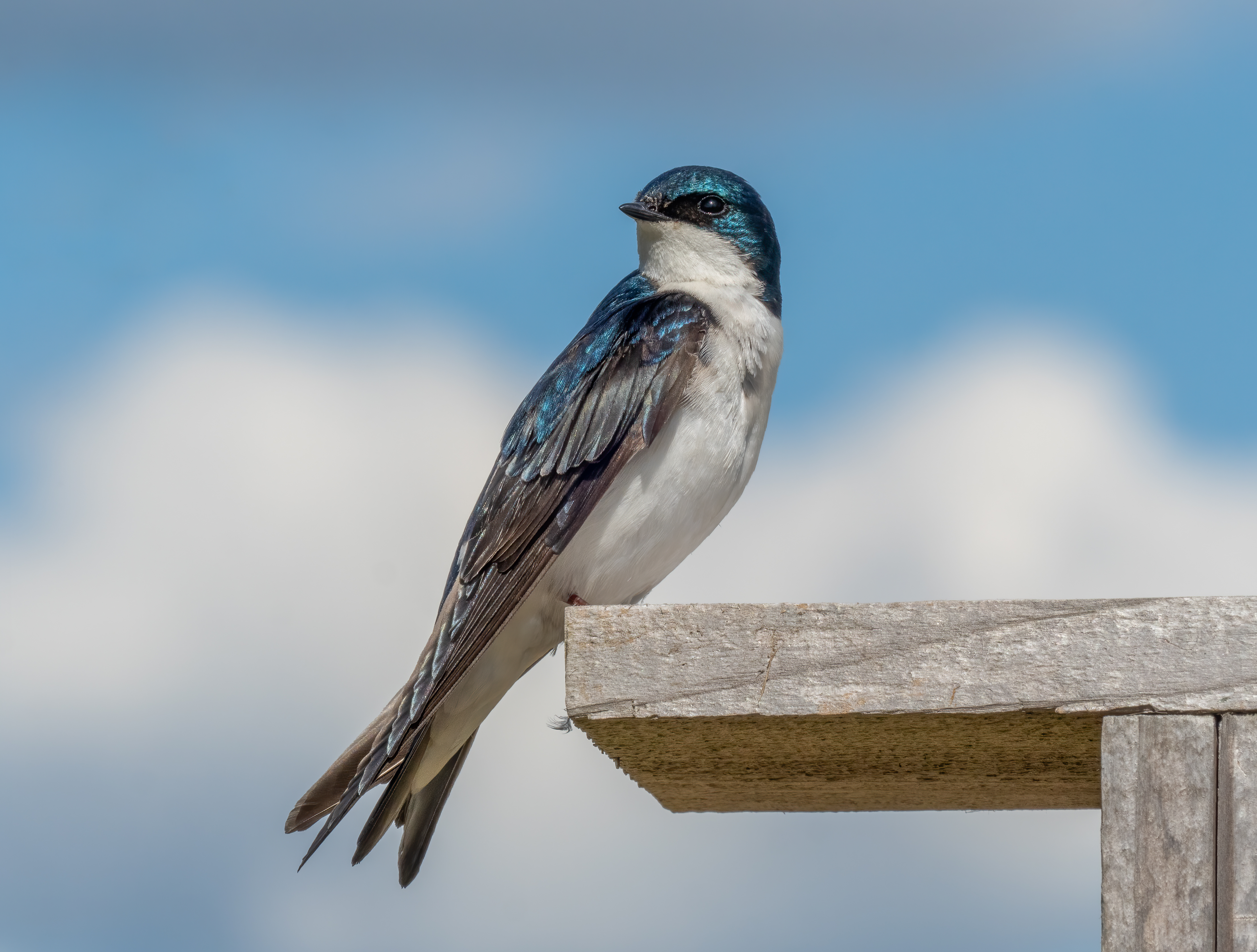
Tree swallow in Jamaica Bay Wildlife Refuge

Order: Passeriformes Family: Hirundinidae

The family Hirundinidae is adapted to aerial feeding. They have a slender streamlined body, long pointed wings, and a short bill with a wide gape. The feet are adapted to perching rather than walking, and the front toes are partially joined at the base. Ten species have been recorded in New York.

- Bank swallow, Riparia riparia (B)
- Tree swallow, Tachycineta bicolor (B)
- Violet-green swallow, Tachycineta thalassina (N)
- Northern rough-winged swallow, Stelgidopteryx serripennis (B)
- Purple martin, Progne subis (B)
- Gray-breasted martin, Progne chalybea (N)
- Barn swallow, Hirundo rustica (B)
- Cliff swallow, Petrochelidon pyrrhonota (B)
- Cave swallow, Petrochelidon fulva (N)

== Leaf warblers ==
Order: Passeriformes Family: Phylloscopidae

Leaf warblers are a family of small insectivorous birds found mostly in Eurasia and ranging into Wallacea and Africa. The Arctic warbler breeds east into Alaska. The species are of various sizes, often green-plumaged above and yellow below, or more subdued with grayish-green to grayish-brown colors. One species has been recorded in New York.

- Arctic warbler, Phylloscopus borealis (accidental)

== Kinglets ==
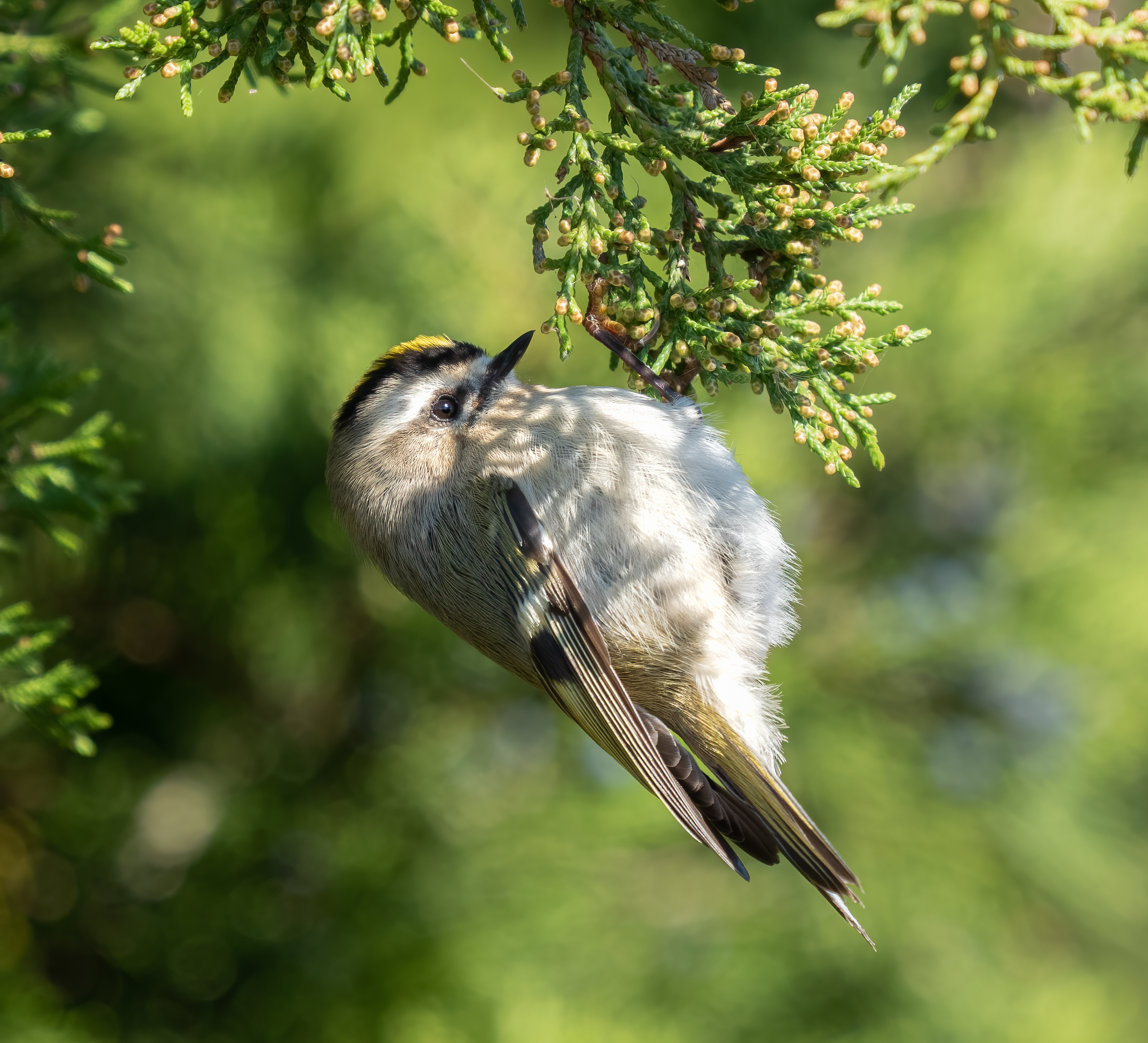
Golden-crowned kinglet in Jamaica Bay Wildlife Refuge

Order: Passeriformes Family: Regulidae

The kinglets are a small family of birds which resemble the titmice. They are very small insectivorous birds. The adults have colored crowns, giving rise to their name. Two species have been recorded in New York.

- Ruby-crowned kinglet, Corthylio calendula (B)
- Golden-crowned kinglet, Regulus satrapa (B)

== Waxwings ==
Order: Passeriformes Family: Bombycillidae

The waxwings are a group of passerine birds with soft silky plumage and unique red tips to some of the wing feathers. In the Bohemian and cedar waxwings, these tips look like sealing wax and give the group its name. These are arboreal birds of northern forests. They live on insects in summer and berries in winter. Two species have been recorded in New York.

- Bohemian waxwing, Bombycilla garrulus
- Cedar waxwing, Bombycilla cedrorum (B)

== Nuthatches ==
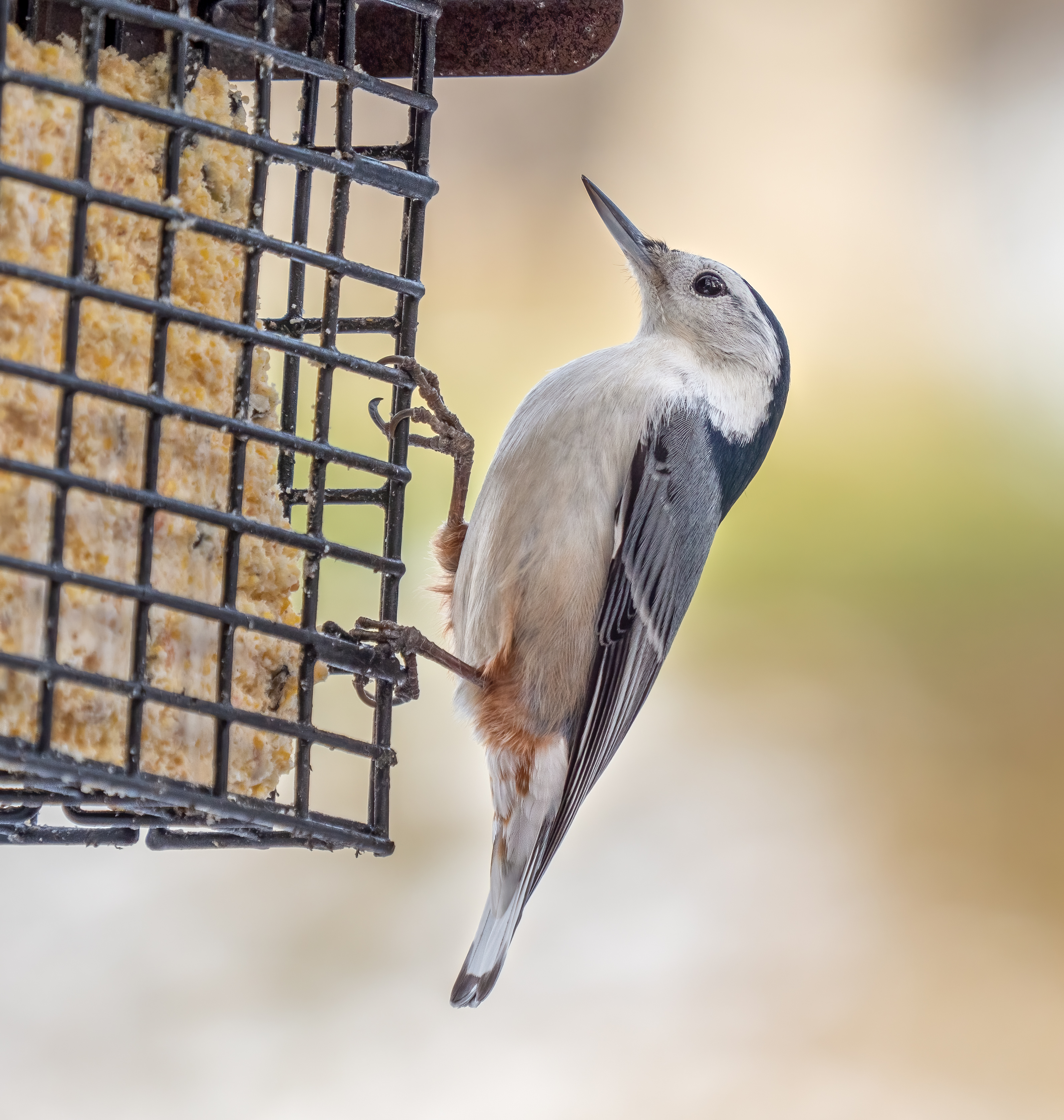
White-breasted nuthatch at a feeder in Green-Wood Cemetery

Order: Passeriformes Family: Sittidae

Nuthatches are small woodland birds. They have the unusual ability to climb down trees head first, unlike other birds which can only go upwards. Nuthatches have big heads, short tails, and powerful bills and feet. Three species have been recorded in New York.

- Red-breasted nuthatch, Sitta canadensis (B)
- White-breasted nuthatch, Sitta carolinensis (B)
- Brown-headed nuthatch, Sitta pusilla (N)

== Treecreepers ==
Order: Passeriformes Family: Certhiidae

Treecreepers are small woodland birds, brown above and white below. They have thin pointed down-curved bills, which they use to extricate insects from bark. They have stiff tail feathers, like woodpeckers, which they use to support themselves on vertical trees. One species has been recorded in New York.

- Brown creeper, Certhia americana (B)

== Gnatcatchers ==
Order: Passeriformes Family: Polioptilidae

These dainty birds resemble Old World warblers in their structure and habits, moving restlessly through the foliage seeking insects. The gnatcatchers are mainly soft bluish gray in color and have the typical insectivore's long sharp bill. Many species have distinctive black head patterns (especially males) and long, regularly cocked, black-and-white tails. One species has been recorded in New York.

- Blue-gray gnatcatcher, Polioptila caerulea (B)

== Wrens ==
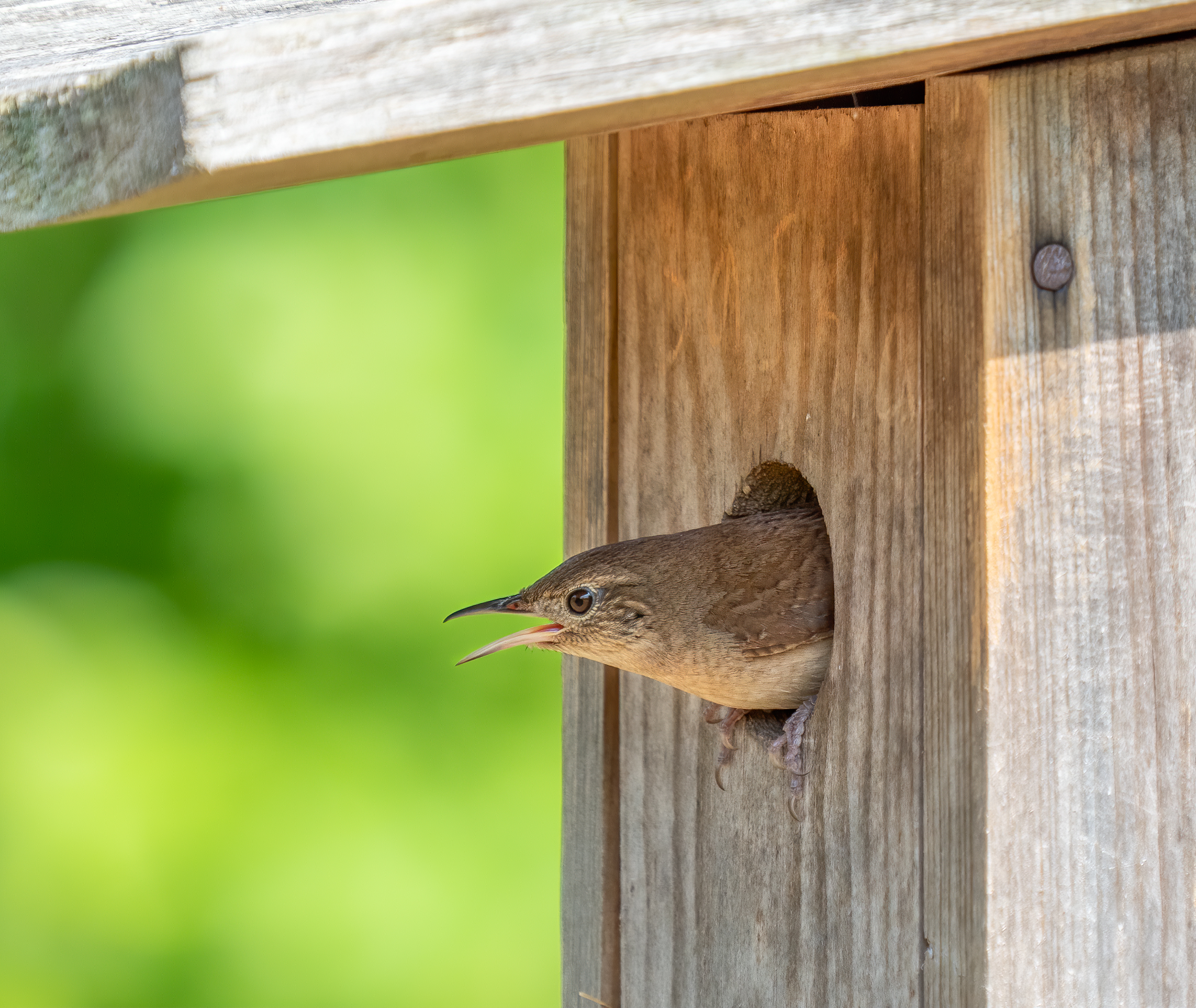
House wren in a nest box in Jamaica Bay Wildlife Refuge

Order: Passeriformes Family: Troglodytidae

Wrens are small and inconspicuous birds, except for their loud songs. They have short wings and thin down-turned bills. Several species often hold their tails upright. All are insectivorous. Seven species have been recorded in New York.

- Rock wren, Salpinctes obsoletus (N)
- Bewick's wren, Thryomanes bewickii (N)(B)
- Carolina wren, Thryothorus ludovicianus (B)
- House wren, Troglodytes aedon (B)
- Winter wren, Troglodytes hiemalis (B)
- Sedge wren, Cistothorus platensis (B)
- Marsh wren, Cistothorus palustris (B)

== Mockingbirds and thrashers ==
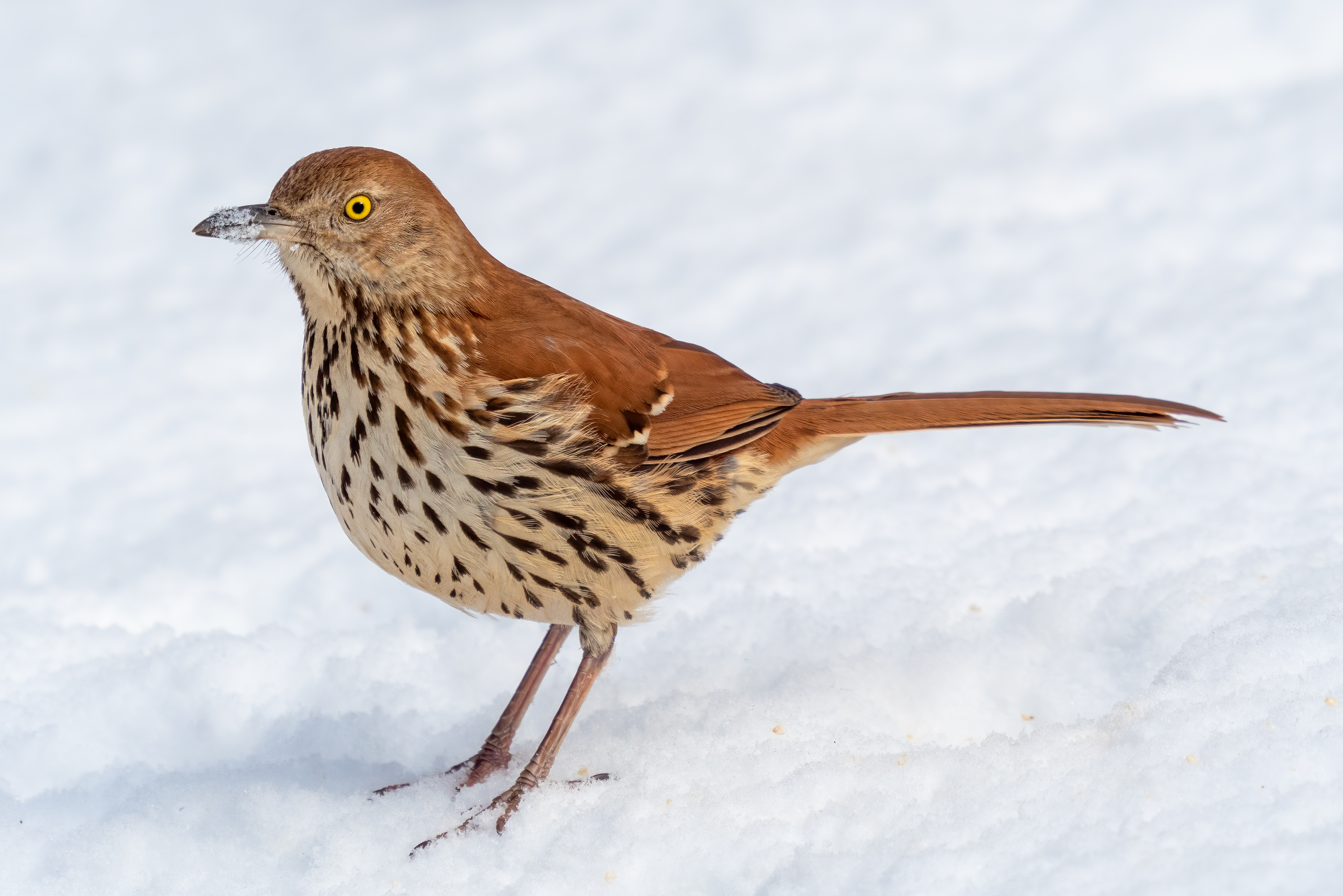
Brown thrasher in Central Park

Order: Passeriformes Family: Mimidae

The Mimics are a family of passerine birds which includes thrashers, mockingbirds, tremblers, and the New World catbirds. These birds are notable for their vocalizations, especially their remarkable ability to mimic a wide variety of birds and other sounds heard outdoors. The species tend towards dull grays and browns in their appearance. Four species have been recorded in New York.

- Gray catbird, Dumetella carolinensis (B)
- Brown thrasher, Toxostoma rufum (B)
- Sage thrasher, Oreoscoptes montanus (N)
- Northern mockingbird, Mimus polyglottos (B)

== Starlings ==
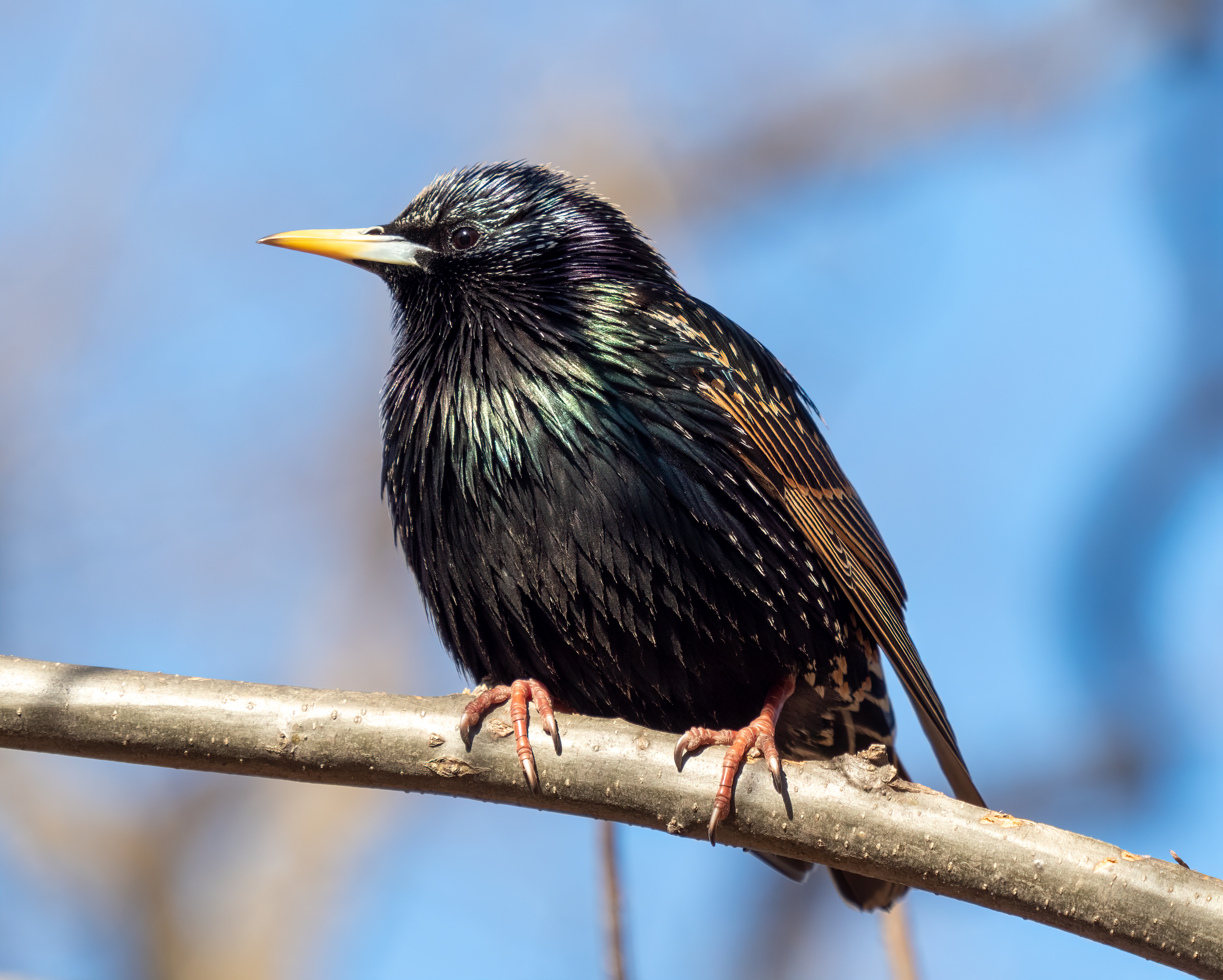
European starling in Central Park

Order: Passeriformes Family: Sturnidae

Starlings are small to medium-sized Old World passerine birds with strong feet. Their flight is strong and direct and most are very gregarious. Their preferred habitat is fairly open country, and they eat insects and fruit. The plumage of several species is dark with a metallic sheen. One species has been recorded in New York.

- European starling, Sturnus vulgaris (I)(B)

== Thrushes and allies ==
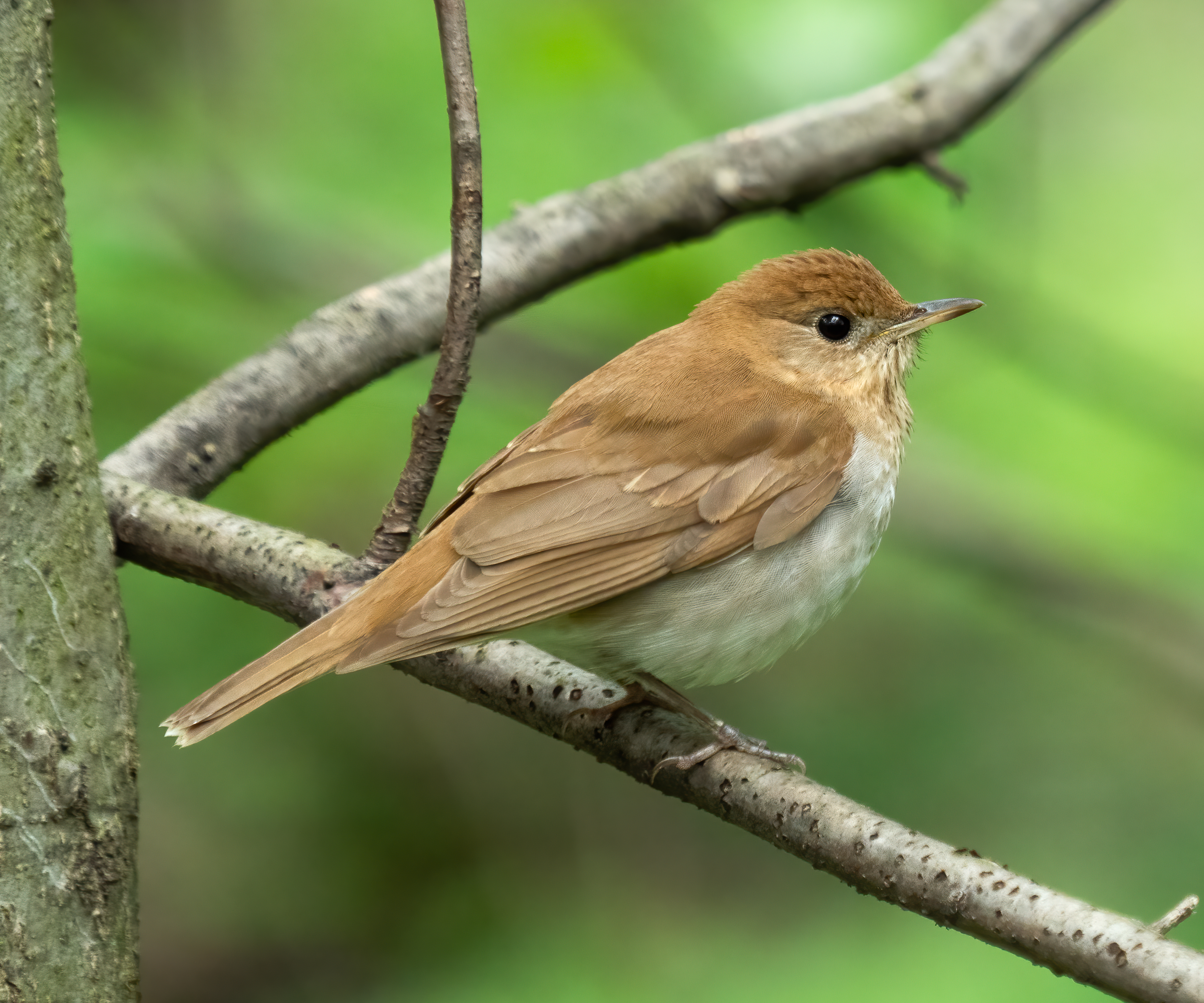
Veery in the Central Park Ramble

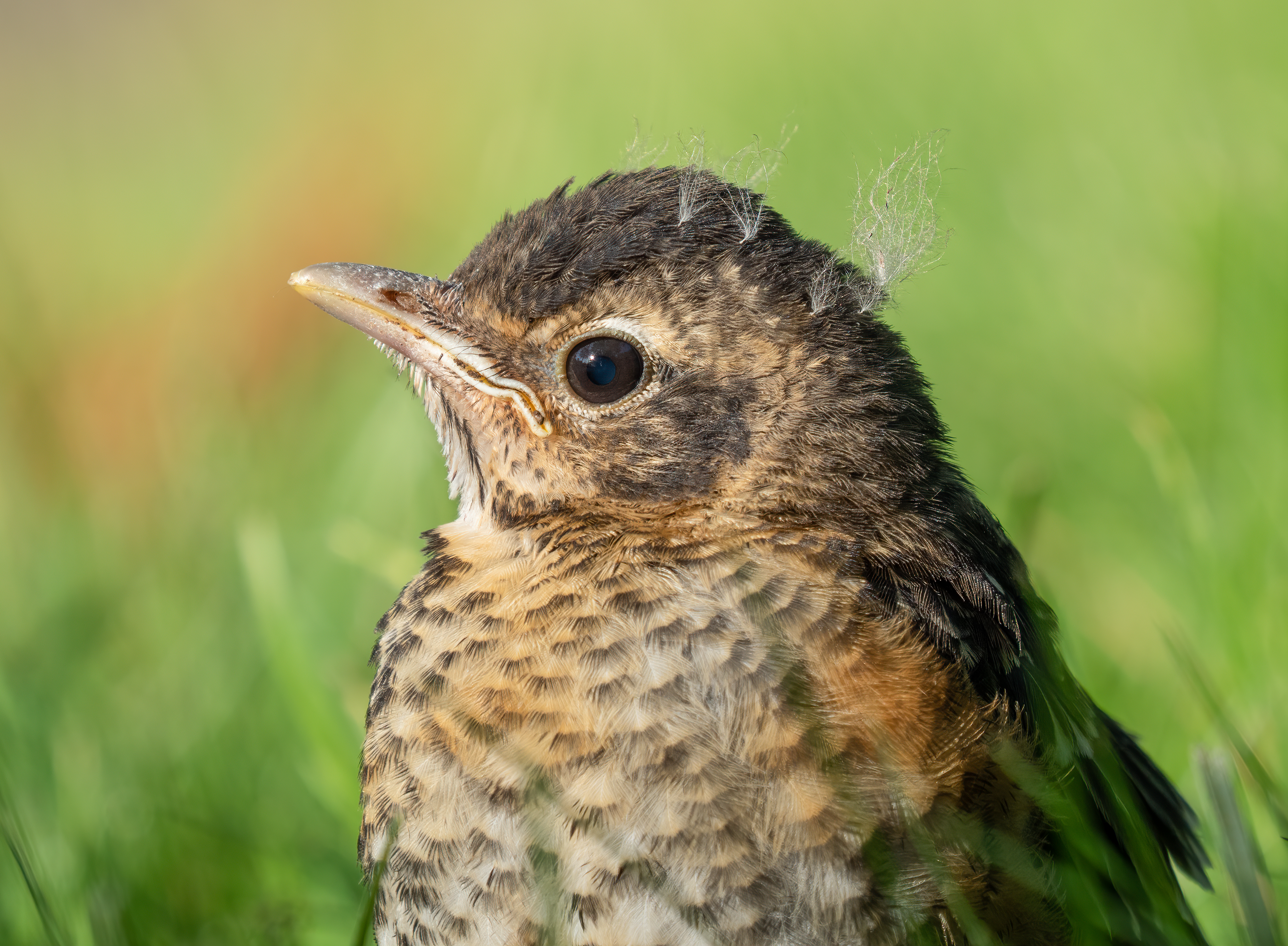
Juvenile American robin in Green-Wood Cemetery

Order: Passeriformes Family: Turdidae

The thrushes are a group of passerine birds that occur mainly but not exclusively in the Old World. They are plump, soft plumaged, small to medium-sized insectivores or sometimes omnivores, often feeding on the ground. Many have attractive songs. Thirteen species have been recorded in New York.

- Eastern bluebird, Sialia sialis (B)
- Mountain bluebird, Sialia currucoides (N)
- Townsend's solitaire, Myadestes townsendi (N)
- Veery, Catharus fuscescens (B)
- Gray-cheeked thrush, Catharus minimus
- Bicknell's thrush, Catharus bicknelli (N outside known breeding area)(B)
- Swainson's thrush, Catharus ustulatus (B)
- Hermit thrush, Catharus guttatus (B)
- Wood thrush, Hylocichla mustelina (B)
- Fieldfare, Turdus pilaris (N)
- Redwing, Turdus iliacus (N)
- American robin, Turdus migratorius (B)
- Varied thrush, Ixoreus naevius (N)

== Old World flycatchers ==
Order: Passeriformes Family: Muscicapidae

The Old World flycatchers form a large family of small passerine birds. These are mainly small arboreal insectivores, many of which, as the name implies, take their prey on the wing. One species has been recorded in New York.

- Northern wheatear, Oenanthe oenanthe (N)

== Old World sparrows ==
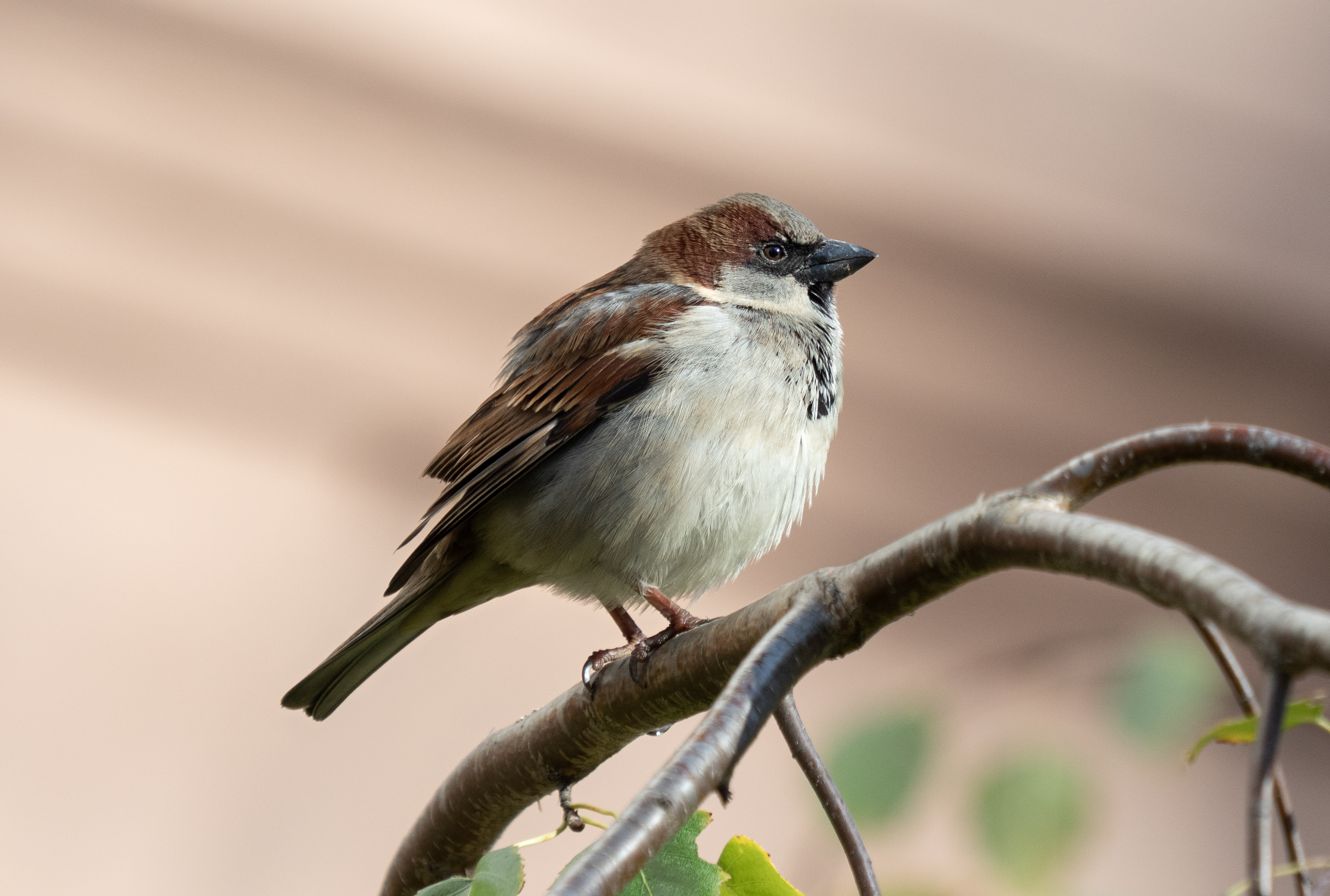
House sparrow in Chelsea, Manhattan

Order: Passeriformes Family: Passeridae

Old World sparrows are small passerine birds. In general, sparrows tend to be small plump brownish or grayish birds with short tails and short powerful beaks. Sparrows are seed eaters, but they also consume small insects. One species has been recorded in New York.

- House sparrow, Passer domesticus (I)(B)

== Wagtails and pipits ==
Order: Passeriformes Family: Motacillidae

Motacillidae is a family of small passerine birds with medium to long tails. They include the wagtails, longclaws, and pipits. They are slender ground-feeding insectivores of open country. One species and a species pair have been recorded in New York.

- Eastern yellow wagtail/Western yellow wagtail ("Yellow") wagtail, Motacilla tschutschensis/Motacilla flava (N)
- American pipit, Anthus rubescens

== Finches, euphonias, and allies ==
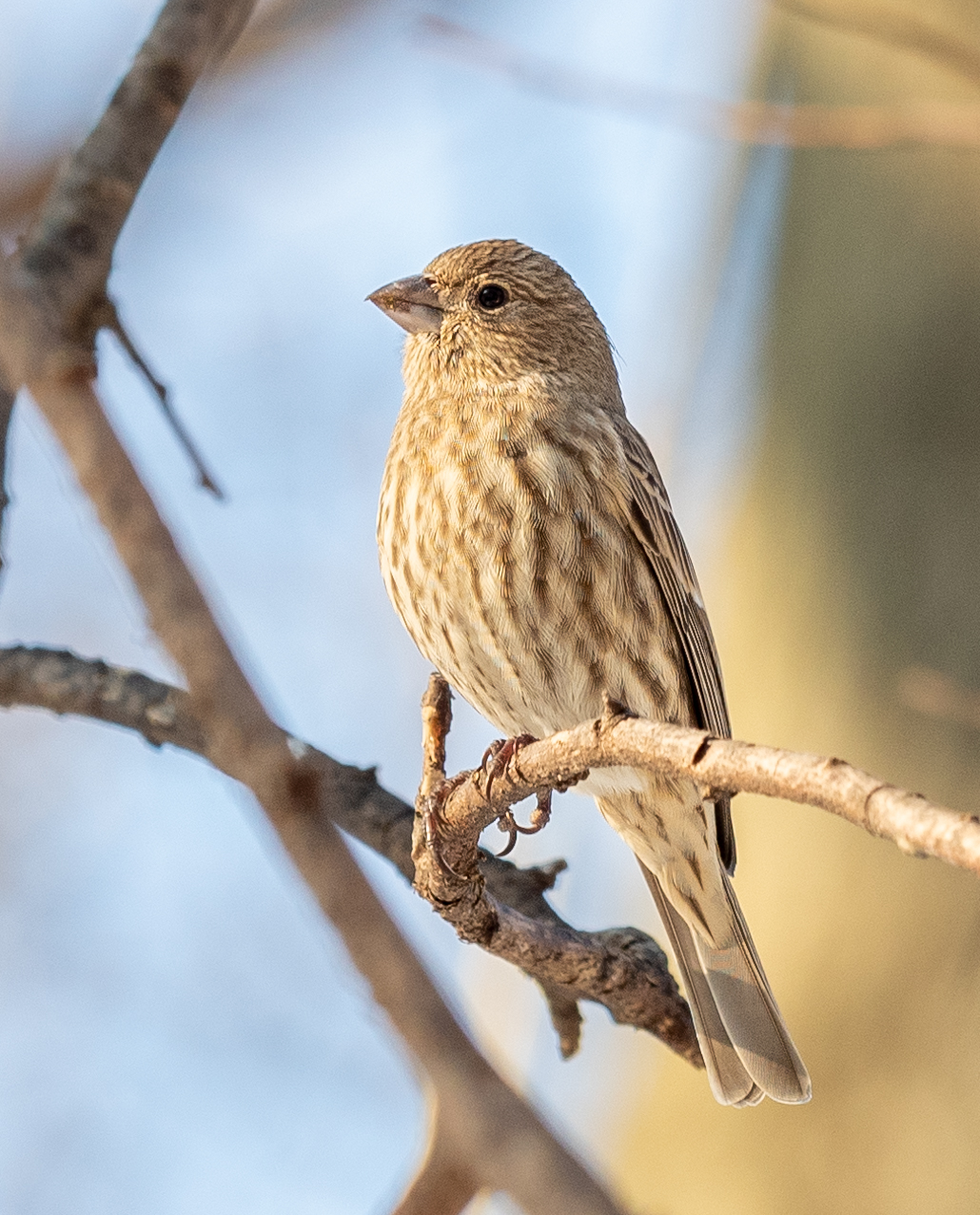
House finch in Central Park

Order: Passeriformes Family: Fringillidae

Finches are seed-eating passerine birds that are small to moderately large and have a strong beak, usually conical and in some species very large. All have twelve tail feathers and nine primaries. These birds have a bouncing flight with alternating bouts of flapping and gliding on closed wings, and most sing well. Thirteen species have been recorded in New York.

- Brambling, Fringilla montifringilla (N)
- Evening grosbeak, Coccothraustes vespertinus (B)
- Pine grosbeak, Pinicola enucleator
- Gray-crowned rosy-finch, Leucosticte tephrocotis (N)
- House finch, Haemorhous mexicanus (I)(B)(native to the southwestern U.S.; introduced in the east)
- Purple finch, Haemorhous purpureus (B)
- Common redpoll, Acanthis flammea
- Hoary redpoll, Acanthis hornemanni (D)
- Red crossbill, Loxia curvirostra (B)
- White-winged crossbill, Loxia leucoptera (B)
- European goldfinch, Carduelis carduelis (IE)(B)
- Pine siskin, Spinus pinus (B)
- American goldfinch, Spinus tristis (B)

== Longspurs and snow buntings ==
Order: Passeriformes Family: Calcariidae

The Calcariidae are a group of passerine birds that have been traditionally grouped with the New World sparrows, but differ in a number of respects. They are usually found in open grassy areas. Four species have been recorded in New York.

- Lapland longspur, Calcarius lapponicus
- Chestnut-collared longspur, Calcarius ornatus (N)
- Smith's longspur, Calcarius pictus (N)
- Snow bunting, Plectrophenax nivalis

== New World sparrows ==
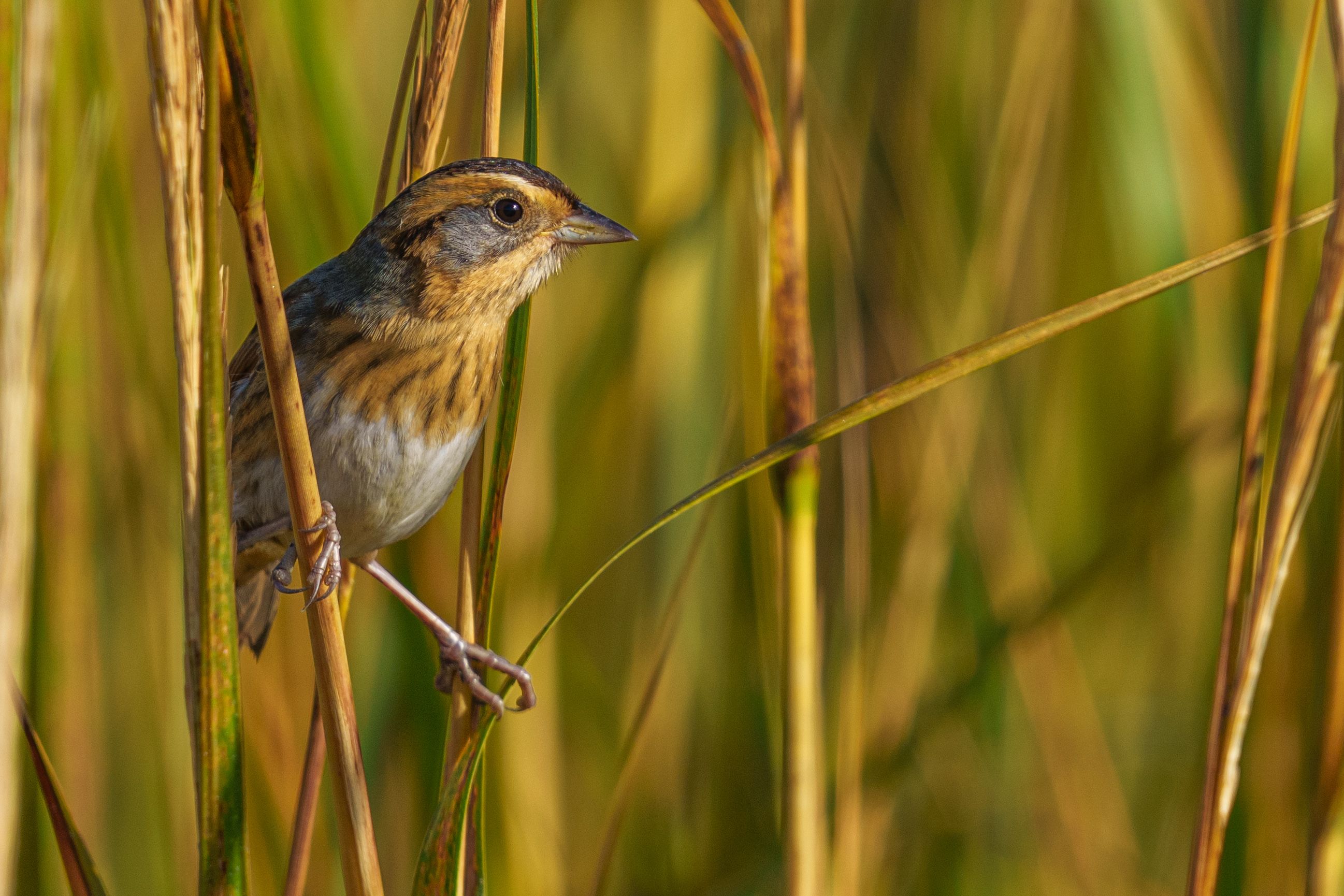
Nelson's sparrow on Plumb Beach

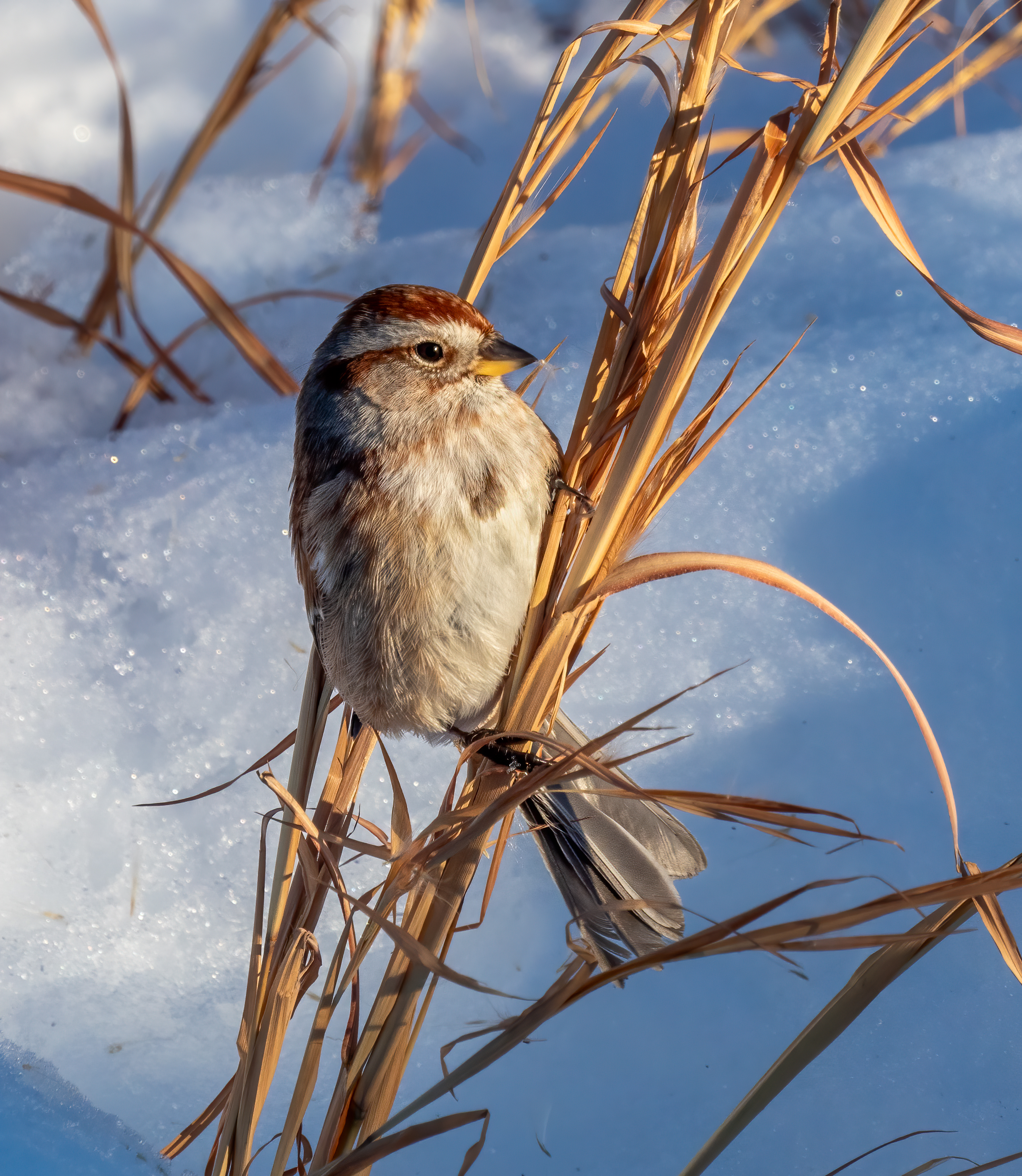
American tree sparrow in Central Park

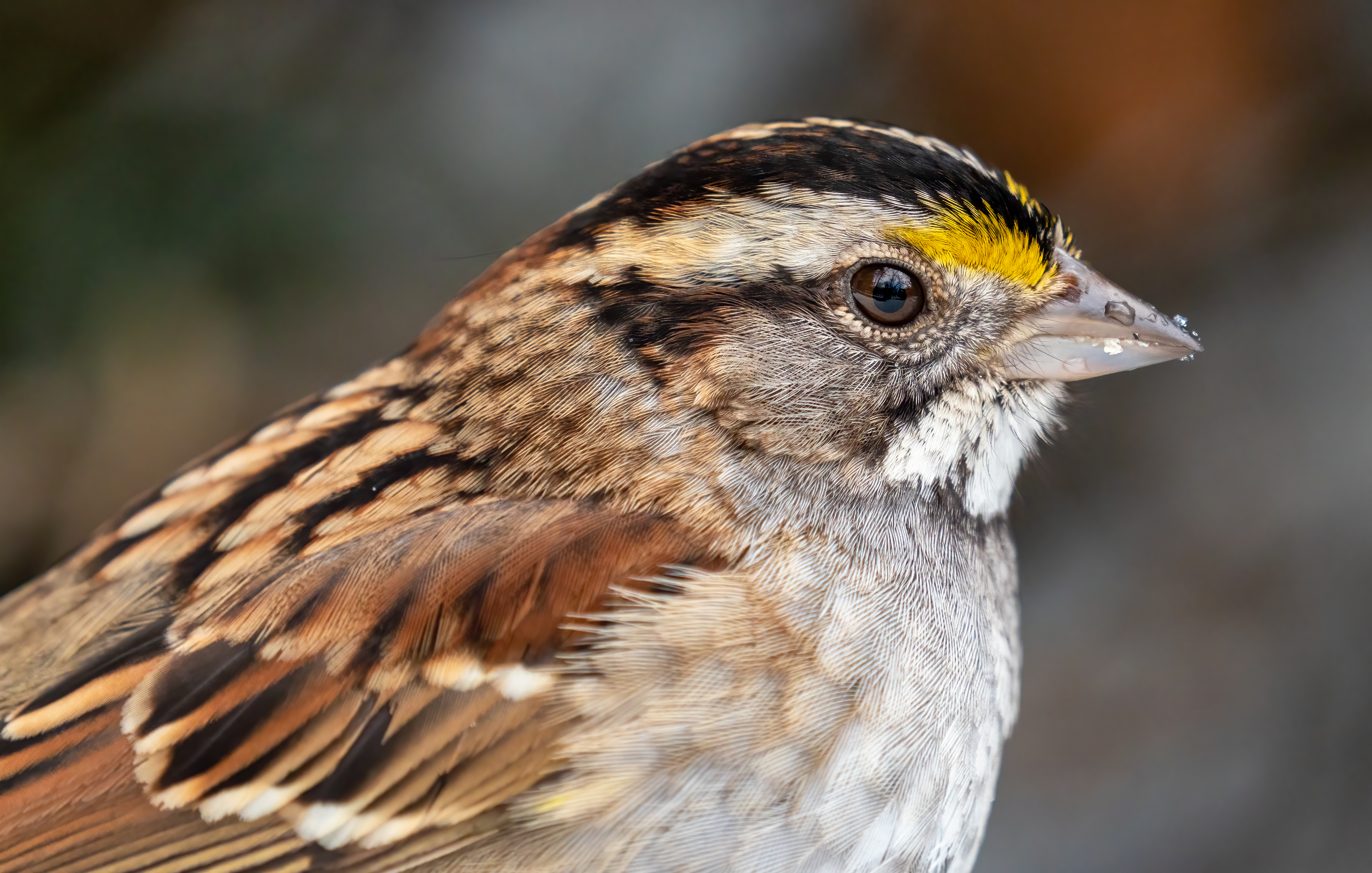
White-throated sparrow in Central Park

Order: Passeriformes Family: Passerellidae

Until 2017, these species were considered part of the family Emberizidae. Most of the species are known as sparrows, but these birds are not closely related to the Old World sparrows which are in the family Passeridae. Many of these have distinctive head patterns. Twenty-nine species have been recorded in New York.

- Cassin's sparrow, Peucaea cassinii (N)
- Bachman's sparrow, Peucaea aestivalis (N)
- Grasshopper sparrow, Ammodramus savannarum (B)
- Lark sparrow, Chondestes grammacus
- Lark bunting, Calamospiza melanocorys (N)
- Chipping sparrow, Spizella passerina (B)
- Clay-colored sparrow, Spizella pallida (B)
- Field sparrow, Spizella pusilla (B)
- Fox sparrow, Passerella iliaca
- American tree sparrow, Spizelloides arborea
- Dark-eyed junco, Junco hyemalis (B)
- White-crowned sparrow, Zonotrichia leucophrys
- Golden-crowned sparrow, Zonotrichia atricapilla (N)
- Harris's sparrow, Zonotrichia querula (N)
- White-throated sparrow, Zonotrichia albicollis (B)
- Vesper sparrow, Pooecetes gramineus (B)
- LeConte's sparrow, Ammospiza leconteii (N)
- Seaside sparrow, Ammospiza maritima (U)(B)
- Nelson's sparrow, Ammospiza nelsoni
- Saltmarsh sparrow, Ammospiza caudacuta (U)(B)
- Baird's sparrow, Centronyx bairdii (N)
- Henslow's sparrow, Centronyx henslowii (B)
- Savannah sparrow, Passerculus sandwichensis (B)
- Song sparrow, Melospiza melodia (B)
- Lincoln's sparrow, Melospiza lincolnii (B)
- Swamp sparrow, Melospiza georgiana (B)
- Green-tailed towhee, Pipilo chlorurus (N)
- Spotted towhee, Pipilo maculatus (N)
- Eastern towhee, Pipilo erythrophthalmus (B)

== Yellow-breasted chat ==
Order: Passeriformes Family: Icteriidae

This species was historically placed in the wood-warblers (Parulidae) but nonetheless most authorities were unsure if it belonged there. It was placed in its own family in 2017.

- Yellow-breasted chat, Icteria virens (B)

== Troupials and allies ==
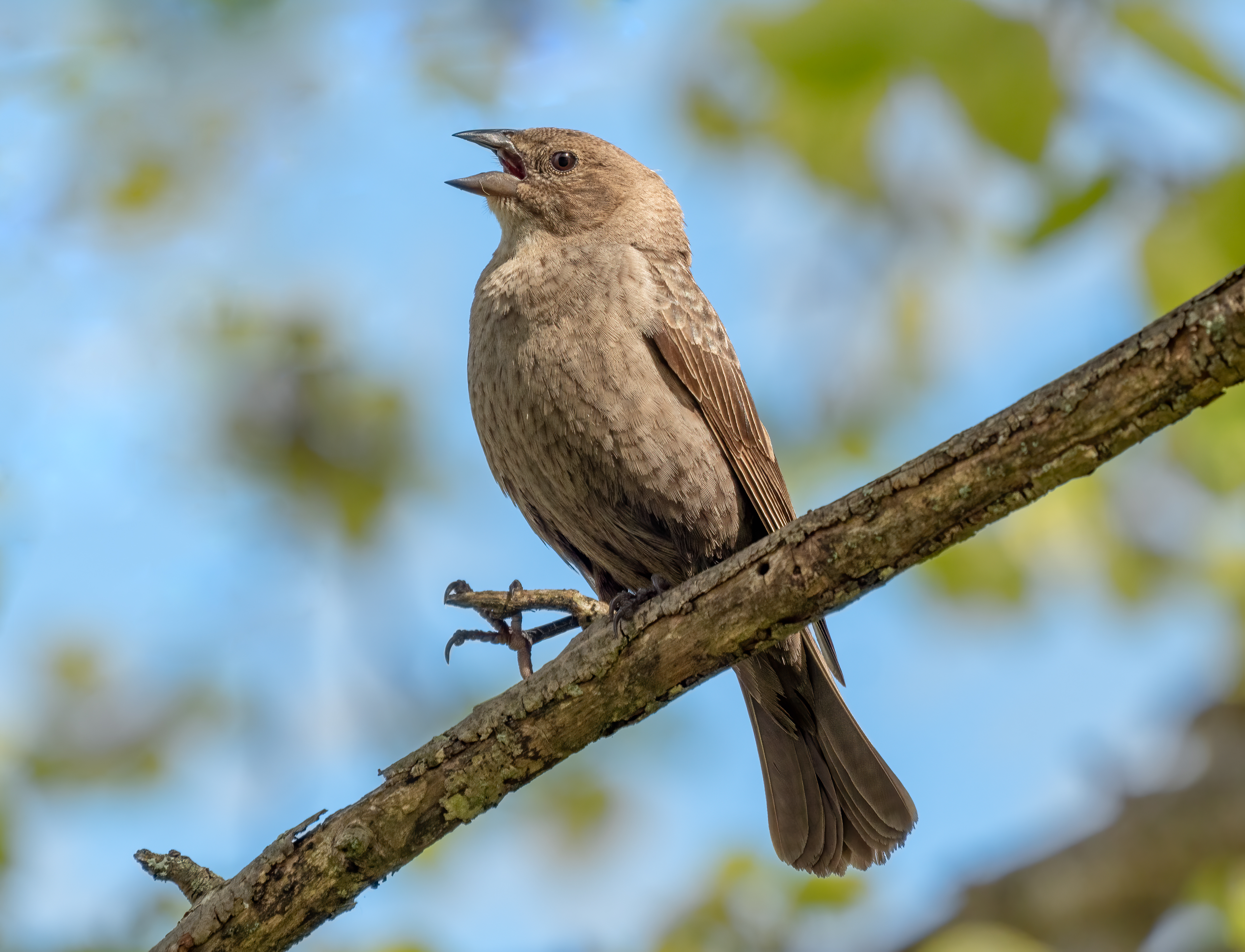
Female brown-headed cowbird chattering in Jamaica Bay Wildlife Refuge

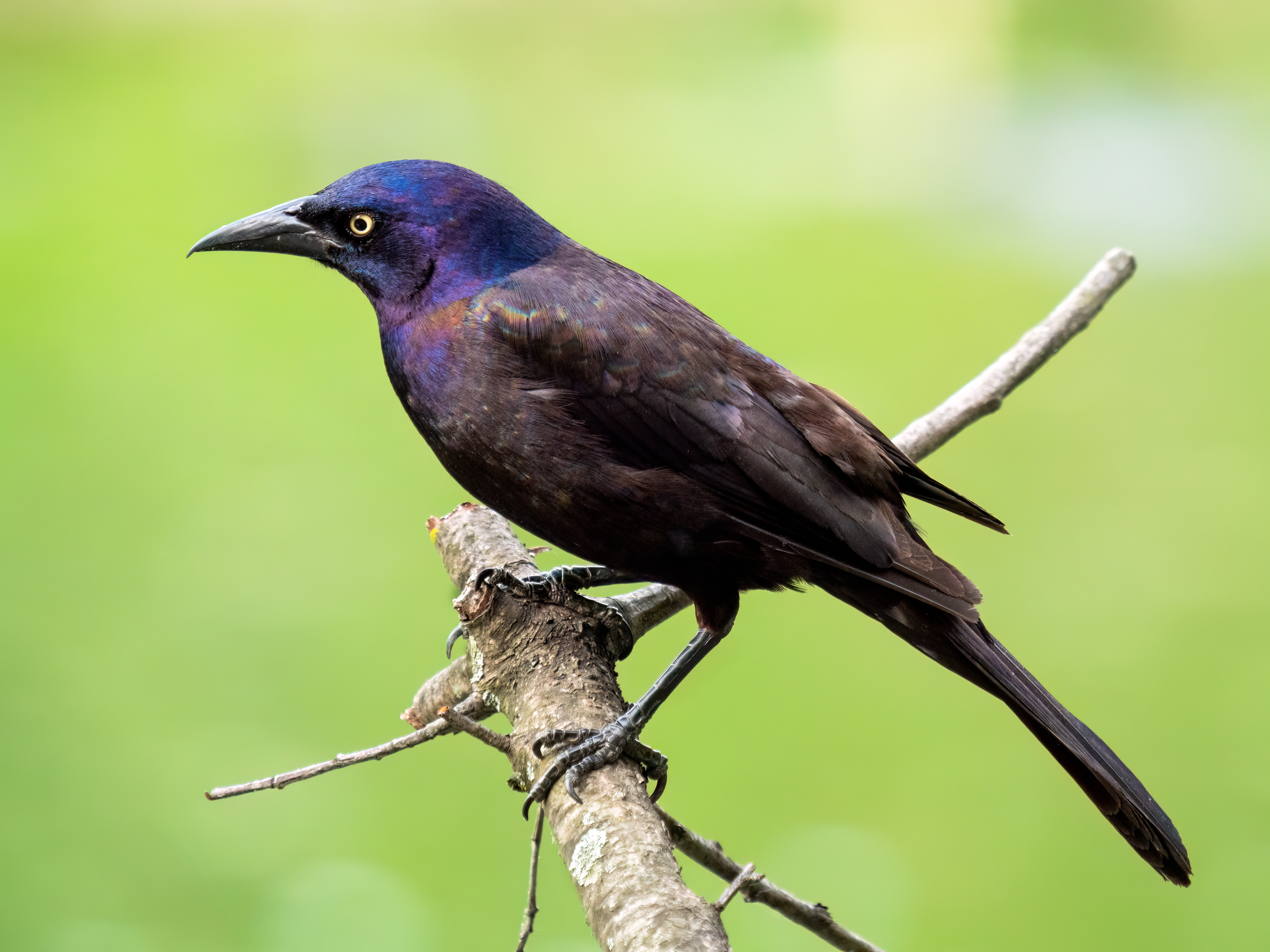
Common grackle on a branch by the Prospect Park Lake

Order: Passeriformes Family: Icteridae

The icterids are a group of small to medium-sized, often colorful passerine birds restricted to the New World and include the grackles, New World blackbirds and New World orioles. Most species have black as a predominant plumage color, often enlivened by yellow, orange, or red. Fifteen species have been recorded in New York.

- Yellow-headed blackbird, Xanthocephalus xanthocephalus
- Bobolink, Dolichonyx oryzivorus (B)
- Eastern meadowlark, Sturnella magna (B)
- Western meadowlark, Sturnella neglecta (N)(B)
- Orchard oriole, Icterus spurius (B)
- Bullock's oriole, Icterus bullockii (N)
- Baltimore oriole, Icterus galbula (B)
- Scott's oriole, Icterus parisorum (N)
- Red-winged blackbird, Agelaius phoeniceus (B)
- Bronzed cowbird, Molothrus aeneus (N)
- Brown-headed cowbird, Molothrus ater (B)
- Rusty blackbird, Euphagus carolinus (B)
- Brewer's blackbird, Euphagus cyanocephalus (N)
- Common grackle, Quiscalus quiscula (B)
- Boat-tailed grackle, Quiscalus major (U)(B)

== New World warblers ==
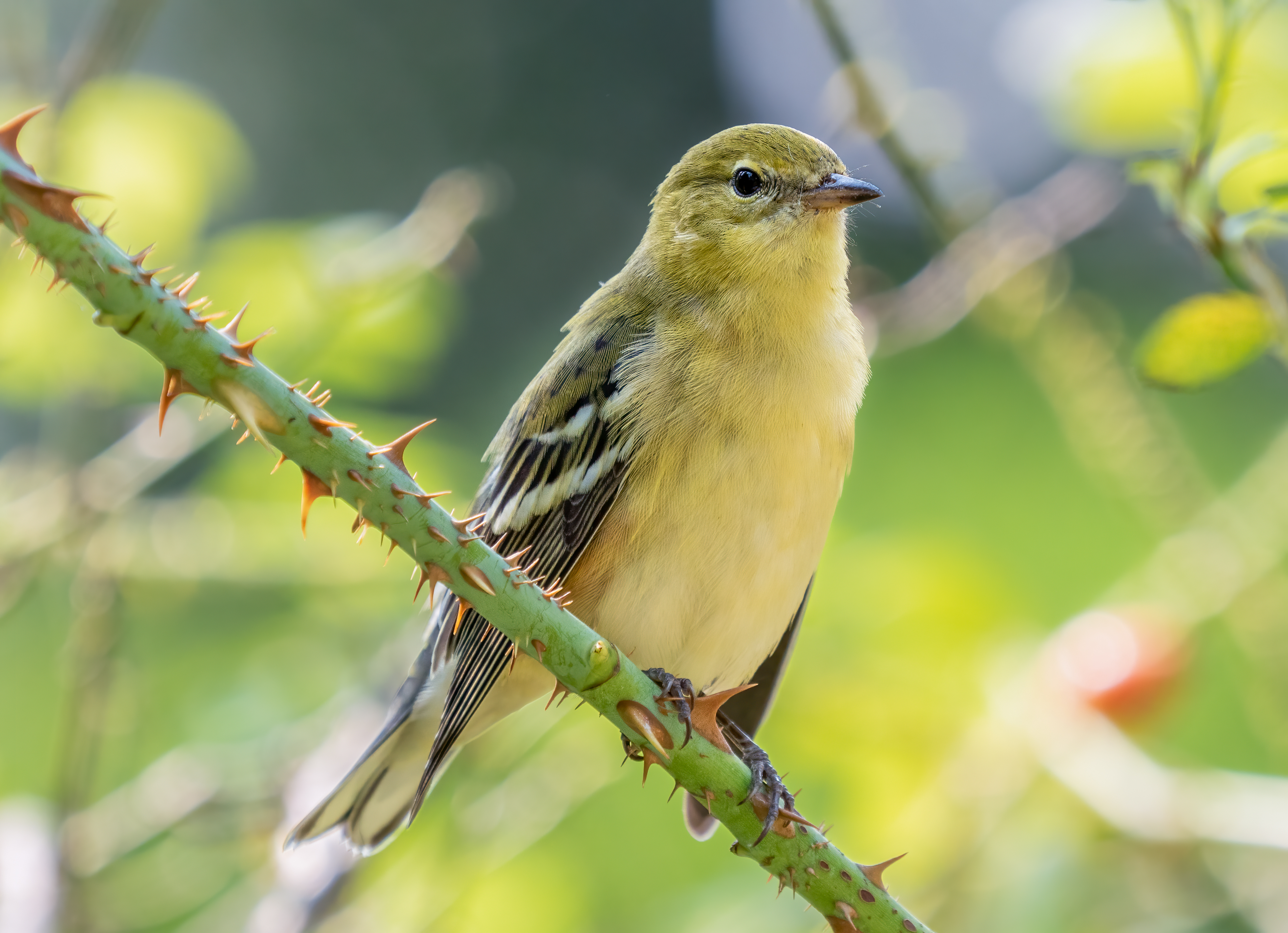
Bay-breasted warbler in Central Park

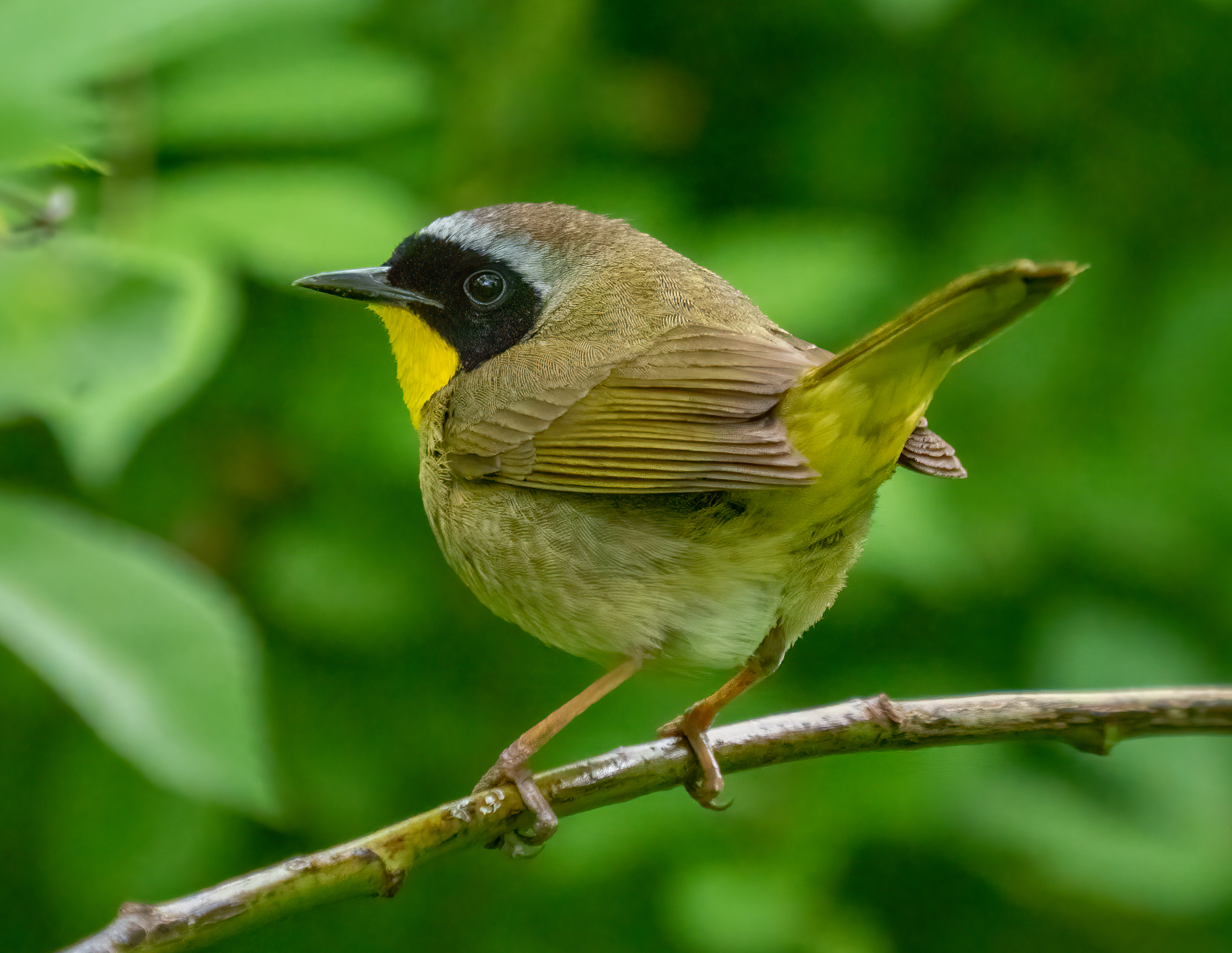
Common yellowthroat in Prospect Park

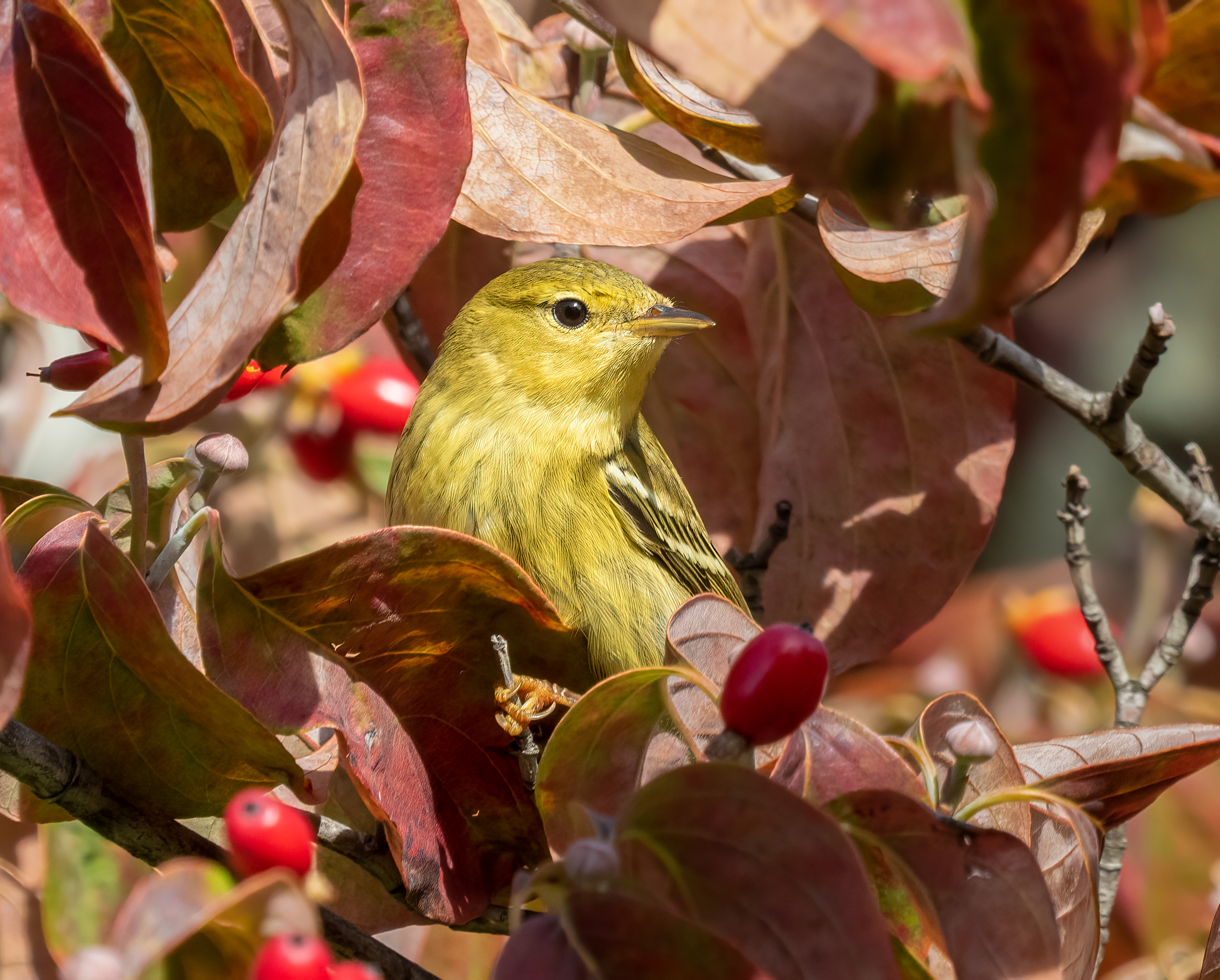
Blackpoll warbler in Green-Wood Cemetery

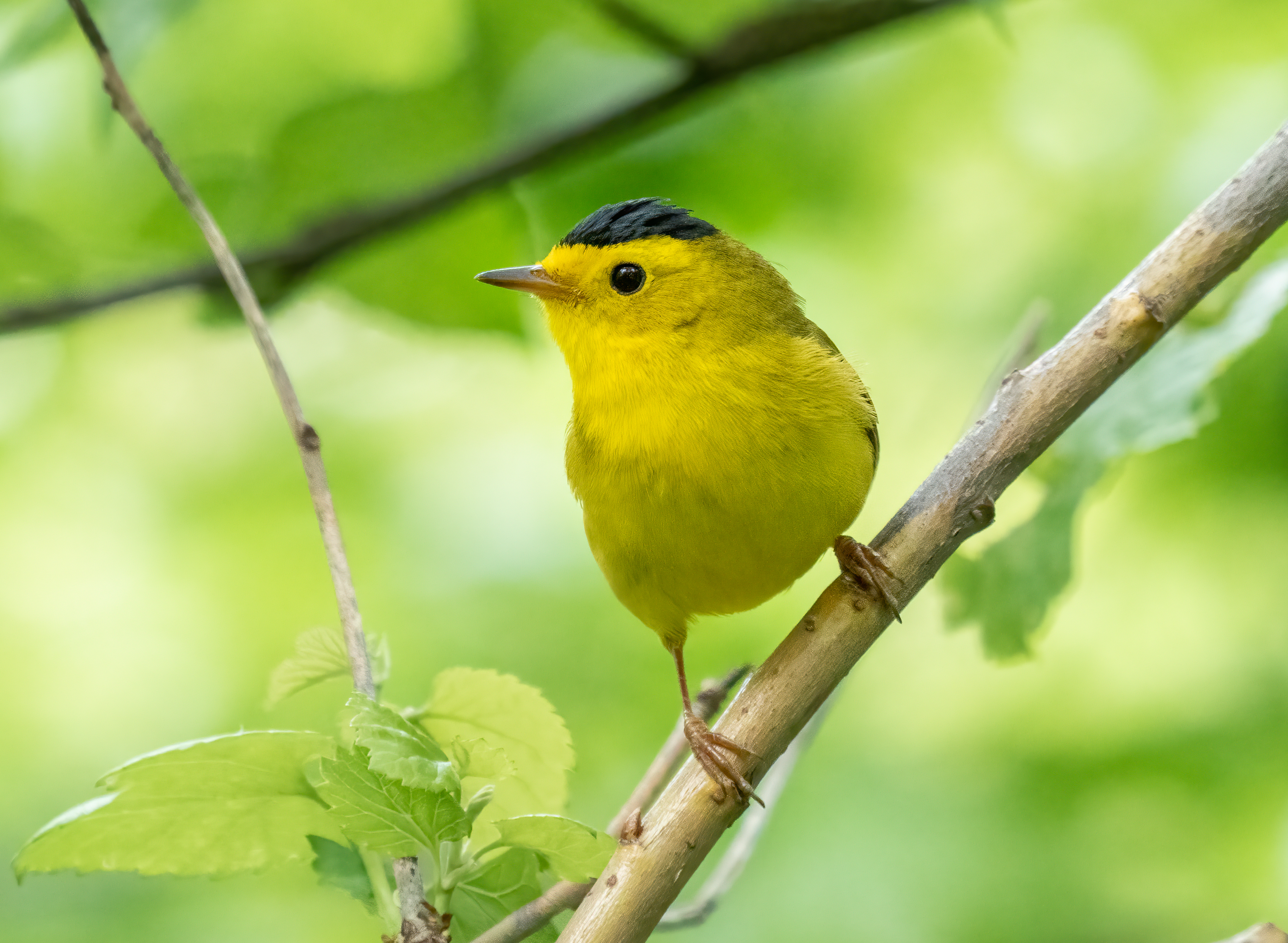
Wilson's warbler in Prospect Park

Order: Passeriformes Family: Parulidae

The wood warblers are a group of small often colorful passerine birds restricted to the New World. Most are arboreal, but some are more terrestrial. Most members of the family are insectivores. Forty-four species have been recorded in New York.

- Ovenbird, Seiurus aurocapilla (B)
- Worm-eating warbler, Helmitheros vermivorum (B)
- Louisiana waterthrush, Parkesia motacilla (B)
- Northern waterthrush, Parkesia noveboracensis (B)
- Golden-winged warbler, Vermivora chrysoptera (B)
- Blue-winged warbler, Vermivora cyanoptera (B)
- Black-and-white warbler, Mniotilta varia (B)
- Prothonotary warbler, Protonotaria citrea (B)
- Swainson's warbler, Limnothlypis swainsonii (N)
- Tennessee warbler, Leiothlypis peregrina (B)
- Orange-crowned warbler, Leiothlypis celata
- Nashville warbler, Leiothlypis ruficapilla (B)
- Virginia's warbler, Leiothlypis virginiae (N)
- Connecticut warbler, Oporornis agilis
- MacGillivray's warbler, Geothlypis tolmiei (N)
- Mourning warbler, Geothlypis philadelphia (B)
- Kentucky warbler, Geothlypis formosa (B)
- Common yellowthroat, Geothlypis trichas (B)
- Hooded warbler, Setophaga citrina (B)
- American redstart, Setophaga ruticilla (B)
- Kirtland's warbler, Setophaga kirtlandii (N)
- Cape May warbler, Setophaga tigrina (B)
- Cerulean warbler, Setophaga cerulea (B)
- Northern parula, Setophaga americana (B)
- Magnolia warbler, Setophaga magnolia (B)
- Bay-breasted warbler, Setophaga castanea (B)
- Blackburnian warbler, Setophaga fusca (B)
- Yellow warbler, Setophaga petechia (B)
- Chestnut-sided warbler, Setophaga pensylvanica (B)
- Blackpoll warbler, Setophaga striata (B)
- Black-throated blue warbler, Setophaga caerulescens (B)
- Palm warbler, Setophaga palmarum (B)
- Pine warbler, Setophaga pinus (B)
- Yellow-rumped warbler, Setophaga coronata (B)
- Yellow-throated warbler, Setophaga dominica (B)
- Prairie warbler, Setophaga discolor (B)
- Grace's warbler, Setophaga graciae (N)
- Black-throated gray warbler, Setophaga nigrescens (N)
- Townsend's warbler, Setophaga townsendi (N)
- Hermit warbler, Setophaga occidentalis (N)
- Black-throated green warbler, Setophaga virens (B)
- Canada warbler, Cardellina canadensis (B)
- Wilson's warbler, Cardellina pusilla (B)
- Painted redstart, Myioborus pictus (N)

== Cardinals and allies ==
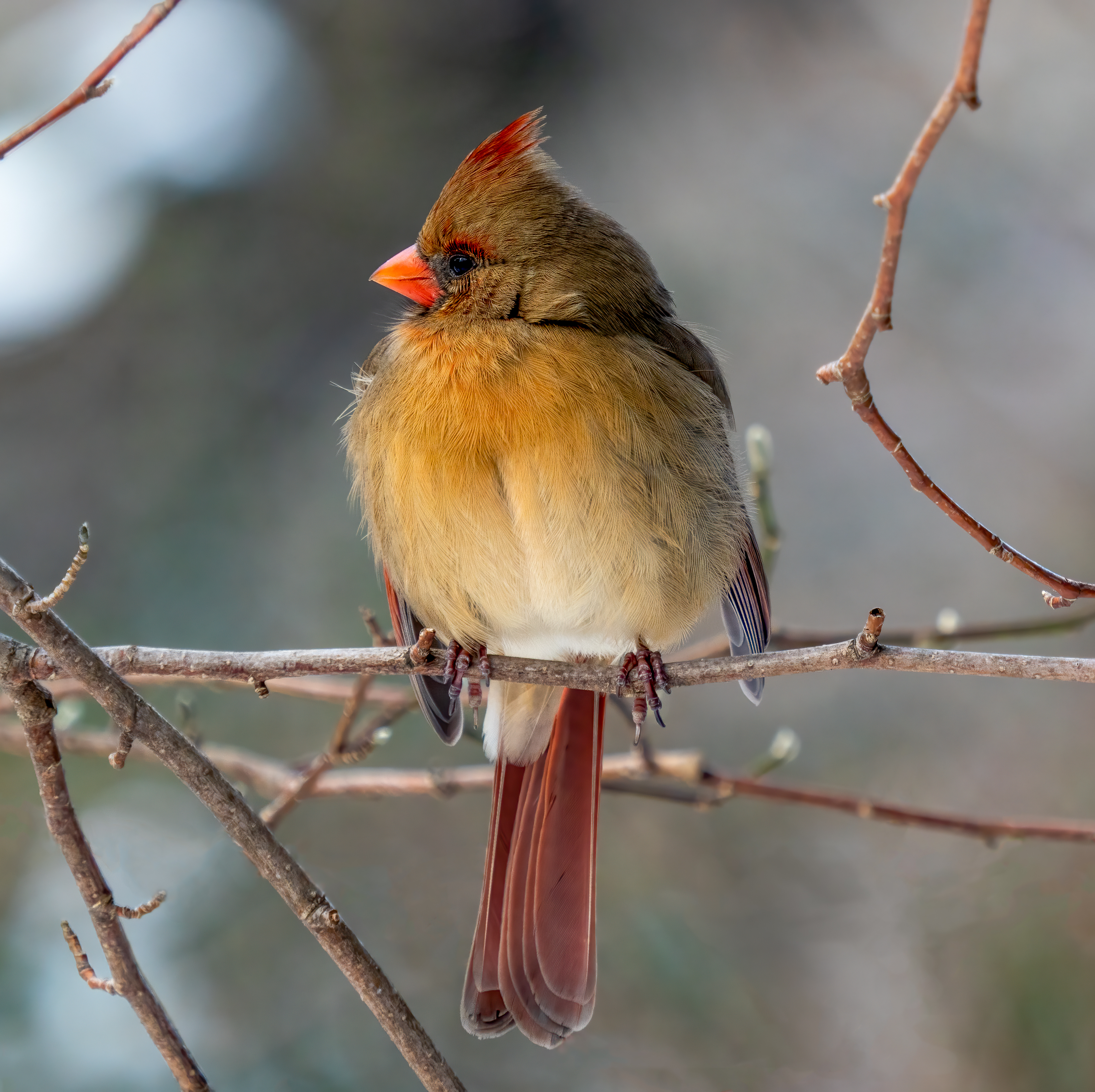
Female northern cardinal in Central Park

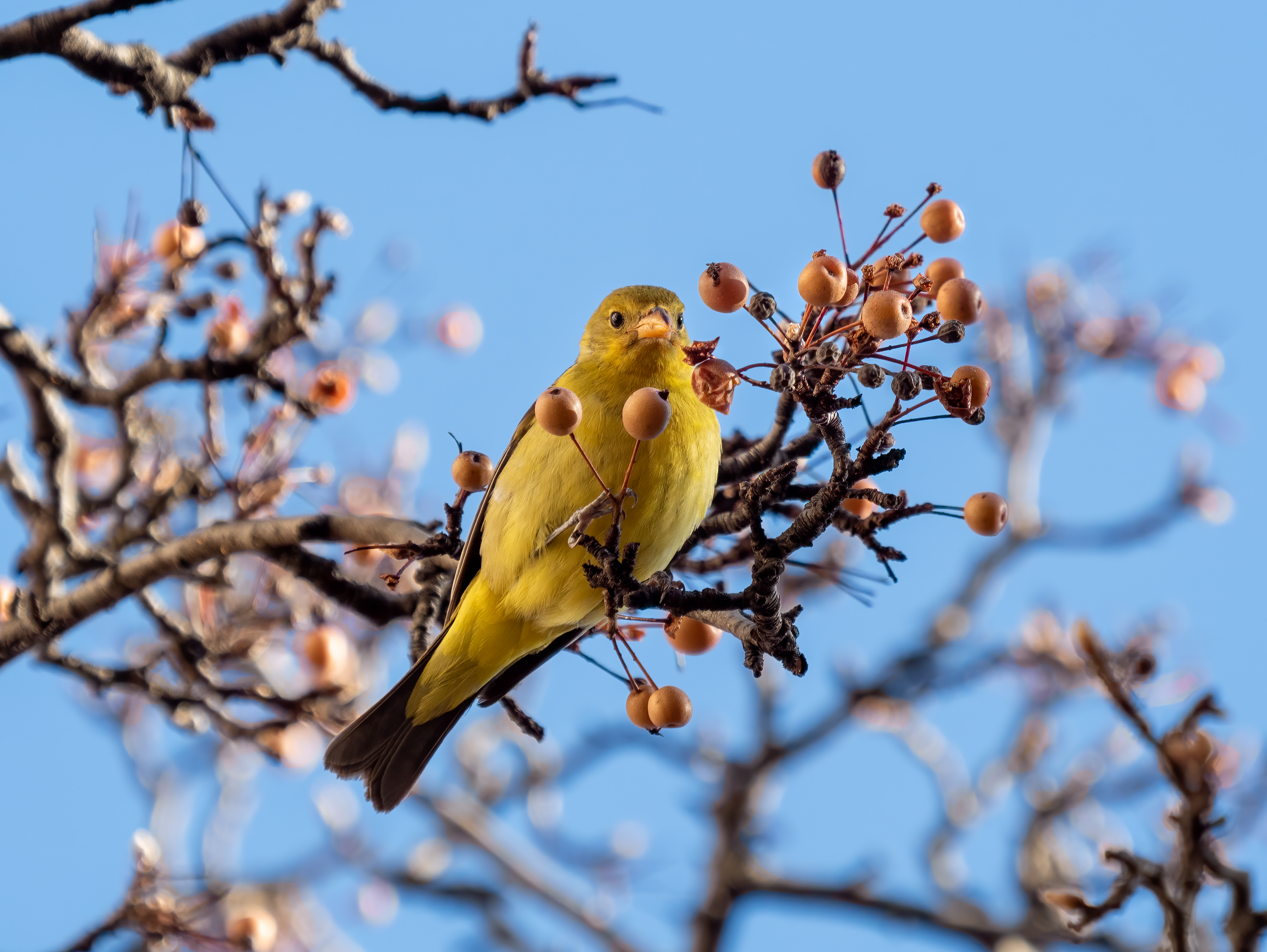
Western tanager in Chelsea, Manhattan

Order: Passeriformes Family: Cardinalidae

The cardinals are a family of robust, seed-eating birds with strong bills. They are typically associated with open woodland. The sexes usually have distinct plumages. Eleven species have been recorded in New York.

- Summer tanager, Piranga rubra (U)(B)
- Scarlet tanager, Piranga olivacea (B)
- Western tanager, Piranga ludoviciana (N)
- Northern cardinal, Cardinalis cardinalis (B)
- Rose-breasted grosbeak, Pheucticus ludovicianus (B)
- Black-headed grosbeak, Pheucticus melanocephalus (N)
- Blue grosbeak, Passerina caerulea (U)(B)
- Lazuli bunting, Passerina amoena (N)
- Indigo bunting, Passerina cyanea (B)
- Painted bunting, Passerina ciris (N)
- Dickcissel, Spiza americana (B)

== See also ==
- List of birds
- Lists of birds by region
- List of North American birds
