= Dingle (disambiguation) =

Dingle is a town in County Kerry, Ireland.

Dingle may also refer to:

== People with the surname ==
- Adrian Dingle (American football) (1977–2022), American football player
- Edward von Siebold Dingle (1893–1975), American bird artist
- Edwin Dingle (1881–1972), English journalist
- Graeme Dingle (born 1945), New Zealand mountaineer
- Herbert Dingle (1890–1978), English astrophysicist
- Jack Dingle (born 2003), American football player
- John T. Dingle, British biologist and rheumatologist
- Johnny Dingle (born 1984), American football player
- Jordan Dingle (born 2000), American basketball player
- Dingle Foot (1905–1978), British lawyer and politician

=== Fictional characters ===
- "Mr. Dingle, the Strong", a Twilight Zone episode in the 1960–61 season
- Desmond Olivier Dingle, comedic alter ego of English actor Patrick Barlow
- The Dingles, a large family in the British TV series Emmerdale
- Dingle, a character in the American animated series Secret Mountain Fort Awesome
- Dingle Godwin, a character in the Swiss TV series "Fascht e Familie"
- Doris Dingle, the main character in Canadian animated short The Dingles

== Geography ==
- Dingle, a small wooded valley, a type of Dell (landform)

=== Places in the United Kingdom ===
- Dingle, Liverpool, a district of the city of Liverpool
- Dingle Road railway station serves the town of Penarth, near Cardiff
- The Dingle, Anglesey, a local nature reserve
- Dingle Dell, a section of track at Brands Hatch motor racing circuit in Kent
- The Dingle, a sunken flower garden in The Quarry park, in Shrewsbury, Shropshire
- The Dingle at Dudmaston Hall, Shropshire
- Badger Dingle in Badger, Shropshire

=== Elsewhere ===
- Dingle Lake, a salt-water lake on the Breidnes Peninsula, Antarctica
- Sir Sandford Fleming Park in Halifax, Nova Scotia, Canada, informally known as "Dingle Park"
- Dingle Peninsula, in County Kerry, Ireland
- Dingle, Iloilo, a municipality in Iloilo, Philippines
- Dingle, Sweden, a small town in Munkedal Municipality, Västra Götaland County
- Dingle, Idaho, a small rural town in Bear Lake County, Idaho, United States

== See also ==
- Dingell (disambiguation)
- Dingle Dome (disambiguation)
