= Dingles =

Dingles may refer to:

- Dingles (department store), department store chain with its flagship store in Plymouth, England
- The Dingles, a 1988 Canadian animated comedy short film
- Dingles Fairground Heritage Centre, a museum that featured a collection of historical fairground rides, equipment, and other memorabilia

== See also ==
- Dingle (disambiguation)
