= Chris Foster (folk singer) =

English singer and guitarist

Chris Foster (born 23 April 1948) is an English singer and guitarist known for his interpretations of traditional and contemporary songs.

He was born in Yeovil, Somerset, England, a place where he first heard and started singing traditional songs. He trained as an artist at the Norwich and Chelsea Schools of Art. His professional "break" came in the early 1970s when a music agent spotted him singing at Dingles Folk Club in London. This led to eight years as a professional solo folk singer/guitarist.

He recorded two highly regarded albums in the late 1970s: Layers (1977) and All Things in Common (1979). Both featured mainly traditional songs with often complex fingerstyle accompaniments (some in open tunings) on a Fylde acoustic guitar.

He stopped full-time touring in the 1980s to work on various arts-based projects and settled in Salisbury, where he co-founded Mobile Arts, a mixed media community arts company. Since September 1999 he has been the coordinator of the Baring-Gould Heritage Project. He is a founding member and director of the annual Vaka Folk Arts Festival in Iceland, where he currently resides. He has continued to produce solo albums, tour (both in the UK and abroad), and collaborate with other artists, including his current partner, the Icelandic folk singer and composer Bára Grímsdóttir, as Funi.

== Discography ==
- Layers (1977) Topic Records
- All Things in Common (1979) Topic Records
- Sting in the Tale (1994) Green Man Productions
- Traces (1999) Green Man Productions
- Jewels (2004) Tradition Bearers
- Outsiders (2008) Green Man Traditions
- Hadelin (2017) Green Man Productions

Chris Foster also appeared on the following recordings:

- Fylde Acoustic (1977) Trailer LER 2105 ("Georgie")
- Nuclear Power No Thanks (1981) The Plane Label
- Questions (1994) Fuse Records
- Intruders (1995) Fuse Records
- Rolling Down the Road (1998) Duke Records
- Dead Maid's Land (1998) Wild Goose
- As We Walked Out (2001) Meersbrook Recordings
- Plotters (2003) Meersbrook Recordings
- Funi (2004) Green Man Productions (with Bára Grímsdóttir)
- And They All Sang Rosselsongs (2005) Fuse Records
- Flúr (2013) Green Man Productions (with Bára Grímsdóttir as Funi)
