= Arthur Trezevant Wayne =

American ornithologist (1863–1930)

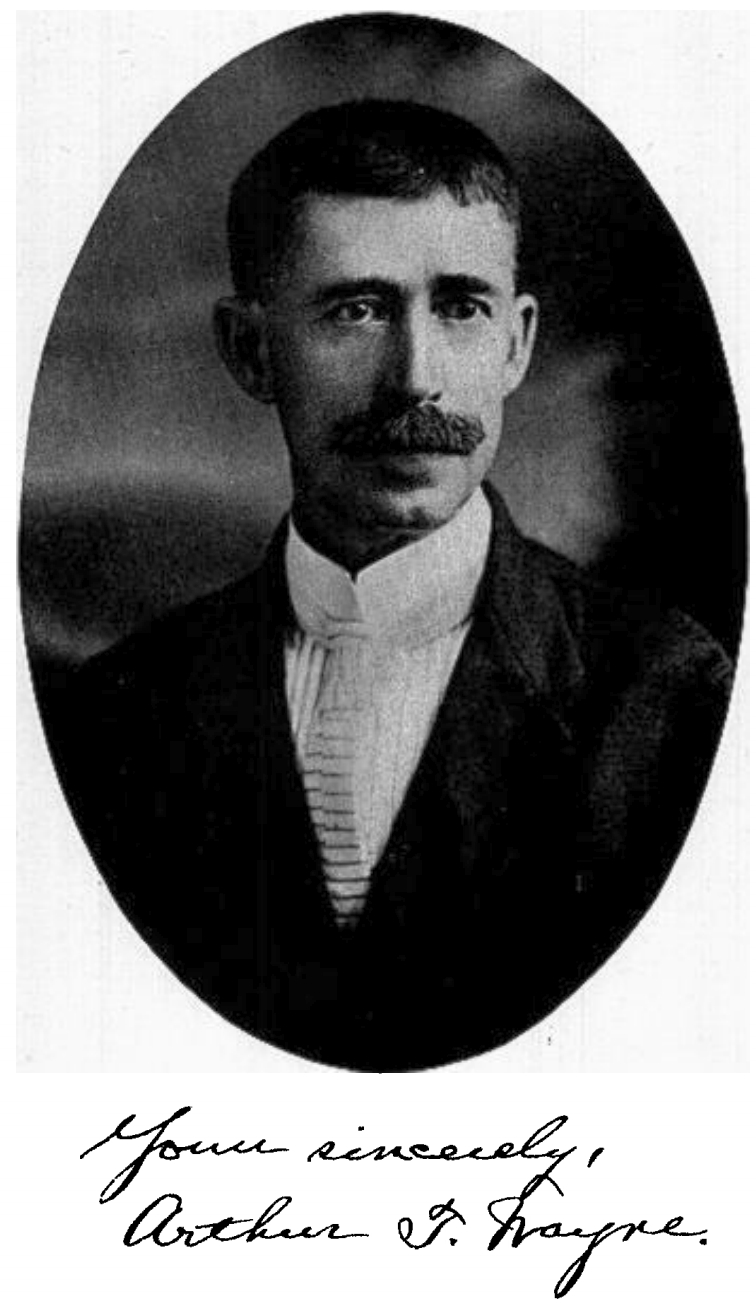

Arthur Trezevant Wayne (1 January 1863 – 5 March 1930) was an American ornithologist who worked in South Carolina. He was involved in the rediscovery of several species of birds including Swainson's warbler and Bachman's warbler. Wayne's warbler, a subspecies of Setophaga virens is named after him.

== Biography ==
Wayne was the son of architect Daniel Gabriel and Harriott Ward Wayne who were of Scottish, English, and French Huguenot ancestry. The family moved from Blackville to Charleston during the American civil war. Right in his school days Wayne began to make a collection of birds eggs. He became a friend of Gabriel Manigault (1833-1899), the director of the Charleston Museum in 1874 and learned to prepare bird skins from John Dancer who worked for Manigault. He then began to work in the cotton industry at Lesesne & Wells. In 1883 Wayne was introduced to William Brewster with whom he spent time to search for Swainson's warbler. Wayne was able to rediscover it the next year and then recorded the nest and eggs of the bird in June 1885. The same year he met Robert Ridgway when on a visit to Washington. He married Maria L. Porcher at Mt. Pleasant on June 6, 1889, and they lived at McPhersonville. In 1892 they visited Florida where Wayne collected Ivory-billed woodpecker specimens among other species. In 1894 he went to Florida where he obtained specimens of Carolina parakeets and saw passenger pigeons. He was noted for his meticulous specimen preparations, sometimes ensuring that no feathers were lost in the field, picking them up and sewing them back into the specimens. In 1910 he published the Birds of South Carolina with assistance from Paul M. Rea, the director of the Charleston Museum. He died at home in Porcher's Bluff. Wayne's warbler, a subspecies of Setophaga virens wayneii was named after him in 1918.
