= Bára Grímsdóttir =

Icelandic composer and folk singer (born 1960)

Bára Grímsdóttir (born 24 April 1960) is an Icelandic composer and folk singer. She is known for her compositions and for her work in preserving ancient Icelandic traditions of folk singing.

== Career ==
Bára Grímsdóttir began her musical studies at age seven. She graduated from the Reykjavík College of Music with a degree in music education in 1983. She also studied composition with Karólína Eiríksdóttir at the Kópavogur School of Music and with Hjálmar H. Ragnarsson and Atli Heimir Sveinsson at the Reykjavík College of Music, completing her composition degree in 1989. She studied composition at the postgraduate level at Utrecht Conservatory (1989–1990) and the Royal Conservatory of The Hague (1990–1992), where her teachers were Louis Andriessen, Tristan Keuris, and Ron Ford.

Bára Grímsdóttir has composed music for solo instruments, voice, choral works, chamber music, and orchestral works. Her music has been performed in Scandinavia, the Netherlands, Germany, Austria and in the United States. She has also worked as music teacher in Iceland and Norway. She was composer-in-residence at the annual Skálholt Summer Music Festival in 1998 and 2000.

Her choral works have been especially popular among Icelandic choirs, particularly her setting of Ég vil lofa eina þá, which has been recorded several times. Her largest work to date is the opera Jón biskup Arason (Bishop Jón Arason, 2021), to a libretto by Vilborg Auður Ísleifsdóttir and Christian Bickel. Still unperformed, it tells of the life and death of Jón Arason, Iceland's last Roman Catholic bishop, in the sixteenth century. Another large-scale work is Ad Beatam Virginem, to a Latin poem by the seventeenth-century bishop and scholar Brynjólfur Sveinsson.

Bára Grímsdóttir comes from a family of folk singers. She has served as the president of the Iðunn Folk Music Society (Kvæðamannafélagið Iðunn) and has performed widely with her husband, the English folk singer Chris Foster. In 2004, she released the album Funi, which has received highly positive reviews, followed in 2013 by the album Flúr.

In 2019, she was made Commander of the Order of the Falcon by the president of Iceland, for her work in promoting the tradition of folk music in Iceland. Her works are published by Iceland Music.

== Selected works ==
- Ég vil lofa eina þá (Ancient religious poetry), 1997.
- Mikils ætti ég aumur að akta (Ólafur Jónsson of Sandar), 2003.
- Hugsun kalda (Ólafur Jónsson of Sandar), 2003.
- Hjartað fagnar (The Heart Rejoices; Hallgrímur Pétursson) for choir and organ, 2011.
- Englar á sveimi (Soaring Angels) for organ, 2014.
- Jón biskup Arason (Bishop Jón Arason), opera, 2021.

== Selected recordings ==
- Virgo gloriosa. Choral Works. Hljómeyki, cond. Bernharður Wilkinson. Smekkleysa, 2002.
- Ég vil lofa eina þá. Kammerkór Langholtskirkju (Langholtskirkja Chamber Choir), cond. Jón Stefánsson, 2002.
- Funi (Fire). Bára Grímsdóttir and Chris Foster. Green Man, 2004.
- Gælur, fælur og þvælur. Songs to poetry by Þórarinn Eldjárn. Vaka-Helgafell, 2007.
- Flúr. Bára Grímsdóttir and Chris Foster. Green Man, 2013.
