= Edward von Siebold Dingle =

American ornithologist and bird artist

Edward von Siebold Dingle (October 18, 1893 – April 21, 1975) was an American bird artist and ornithologist from South Carolina. His collections of bird specimens and some of his paintings are now held at the Charleston Museum.

== Biography ==
Von Siebold Dingle was born near Charleston where his father John Rutledge Dingle ran a plantation with his mother Agatha Von S. Dingle. He grew up taking an interest in nature and began art with his mother. He studied at Porter Military Academy and graduated in 1913 followed by an A.B. degree from the College of Charleston in 1917. He served in the navy during World War I and travelled after the war to sea islands, especially in search of species blown inland after hurricanes. He trained in landscape painting with Alfred Hutty. He married Marie Guerin Ball in 1927 and they settled in Middleburg Plantation in South Carolina, where he lived until his death.

Dingle collected bird specimens and worked with Arthur Trezevant Wayne. He made use of his specimens to produce accurate watercolors of birds in their habitats, mostly in watercolor. He exhibited his bird paintings in 1926 and some of his works were included in an exhibition at the Rockefeller Center in New York in 1937. Several of his paintings went to the Gibbes Art Gallery and the Charleston Museum.
