= Dingle Dome =

Dingle Dome may refer to:

- Dingle Dome (Antarctica)
- Turf Moor stadium - home of the 6 fingered dingles
