= Dingell =

Dingell is a surname. Notable people with the surname include:

- John Dingell Sr. (1894–1955), American newspaperman, businessman, and politician
- John Dingell (1926–2019), American lawyer and politician, son of John Sr.
- Christopher D. Dingell (born 1957), American judge and politician, son of John Jr.
- Debbie Dingell (born 1953), American politician, widow of John Jr.
