= The Dingles =

- Directed by: Les Drew
- Story by: Helen Levchuk
- Produced by: Bill Pettigrew
- Music by: Normand Roger
- Production company: National Film Board of Canada
- Distributed by: National Film Board of Canada
- Release date: 1988
- Running time: 8 minutes
- Country: Canada
- Language: English

The Dingles is a 1988 Canadian animated comedy short film directed by Les Drew.

== Summary ==
Based on a book by Helen Levchuk about a caring, grandmotherly lady and her three cats whose iydlic lives were interrupted by a big windstorm.

== See also ==
- The Cat Came Back - the 1988 Oscar-nominated NFB film similar in content.
