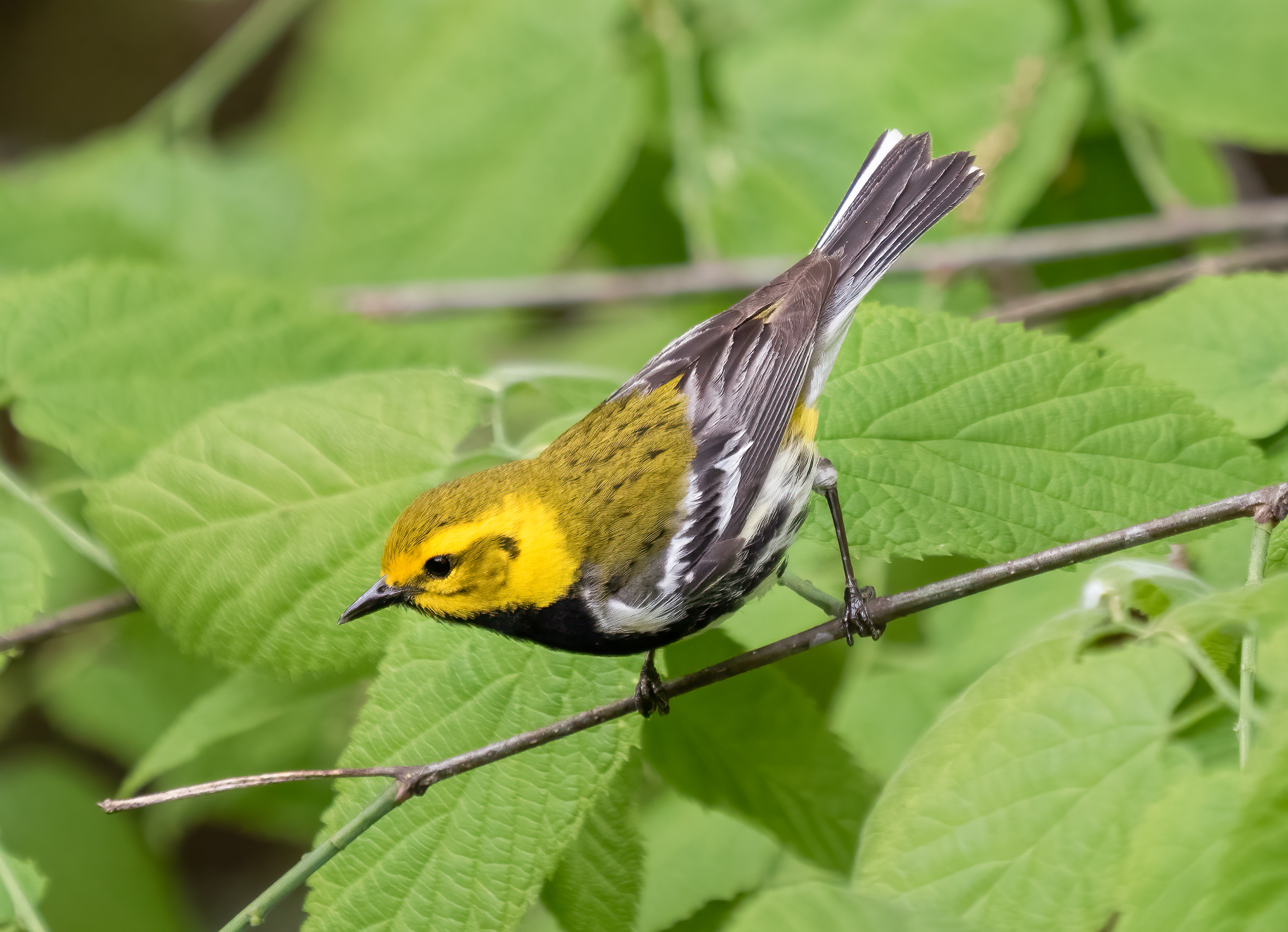
- Male in Prospect Park, New York
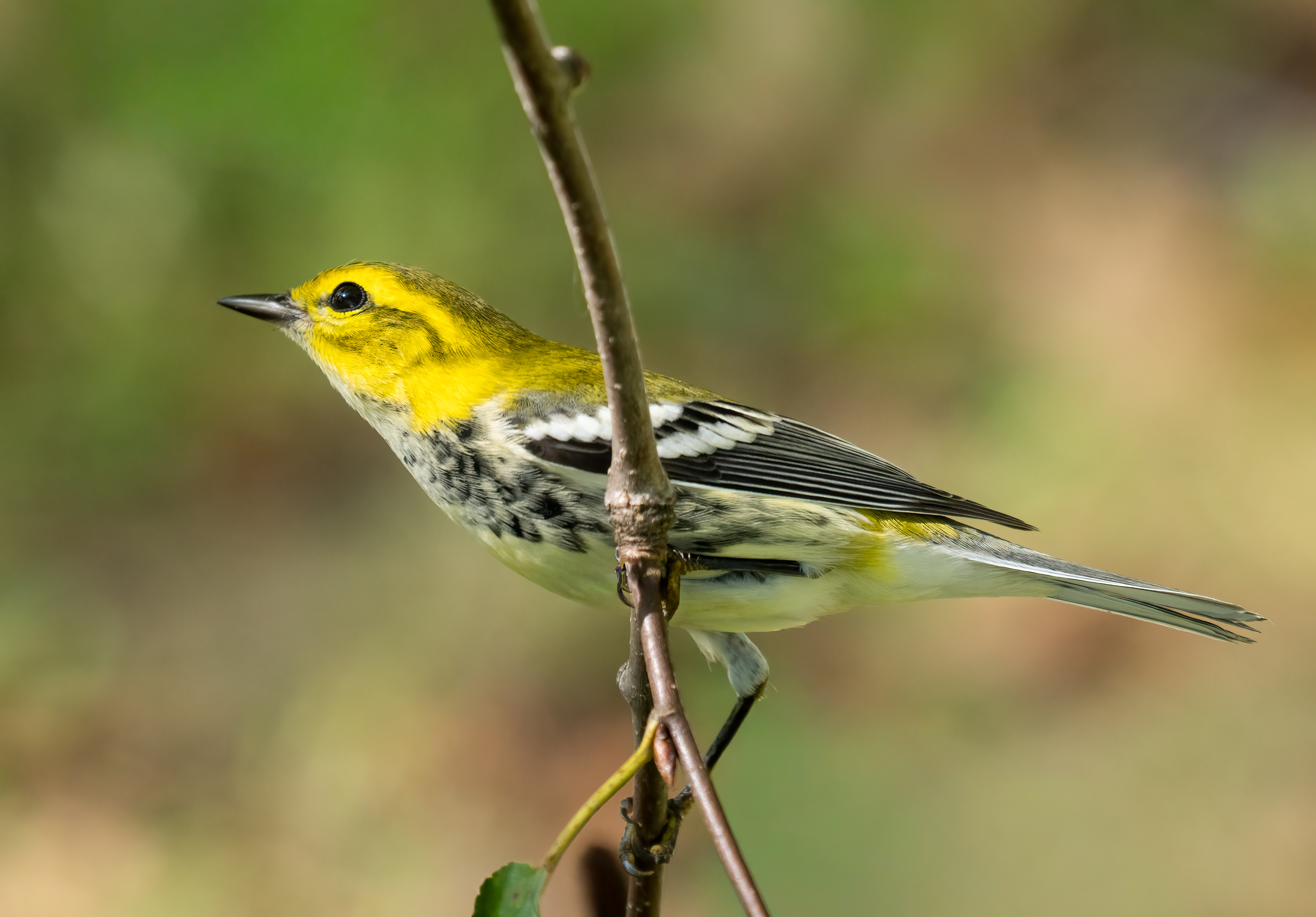
- Female/immature male in Green-Wood Cemetery, New York Song Song

Conservation status
- Least Concern (IUCN 3.1)

Scientific classification
- Kingdom: Animalia
- Phylum: Chordata
- Class: Aves
- Order: Passeriformes
- Family: Parulidae
- Genus: Setophaga
- Species: S. virens

Binomial name
- Setophaga virens (Gmelin, 1789)
- Range of S. virens (note: missing distribution on Hispaniola and Puerto Rico) Breeding range Wintering range

Synonyms
- Dendroica virens

= Black-throated green warbler =

Species of bird

The black-throated green warbler (Setophaga virens) is a small songbird of the New World warbler family.

== Description ==
It has an olive-green crown, a yellow face with olive markings, a thin pointed bill, white wing bars, an olive-green back and pale underparts with black streaks on the flanks. Adult males have a black throat and upper breast; females and immature males have a pale throat and black markings on their breast.

Measurements:

- Length: 4.3–4.7 in (11–12 cm)
- Weight: 0.3–0.4 oz (8.5–11.3 g)
- Wingspan: 6.7–7.9 in (17–20 cm)

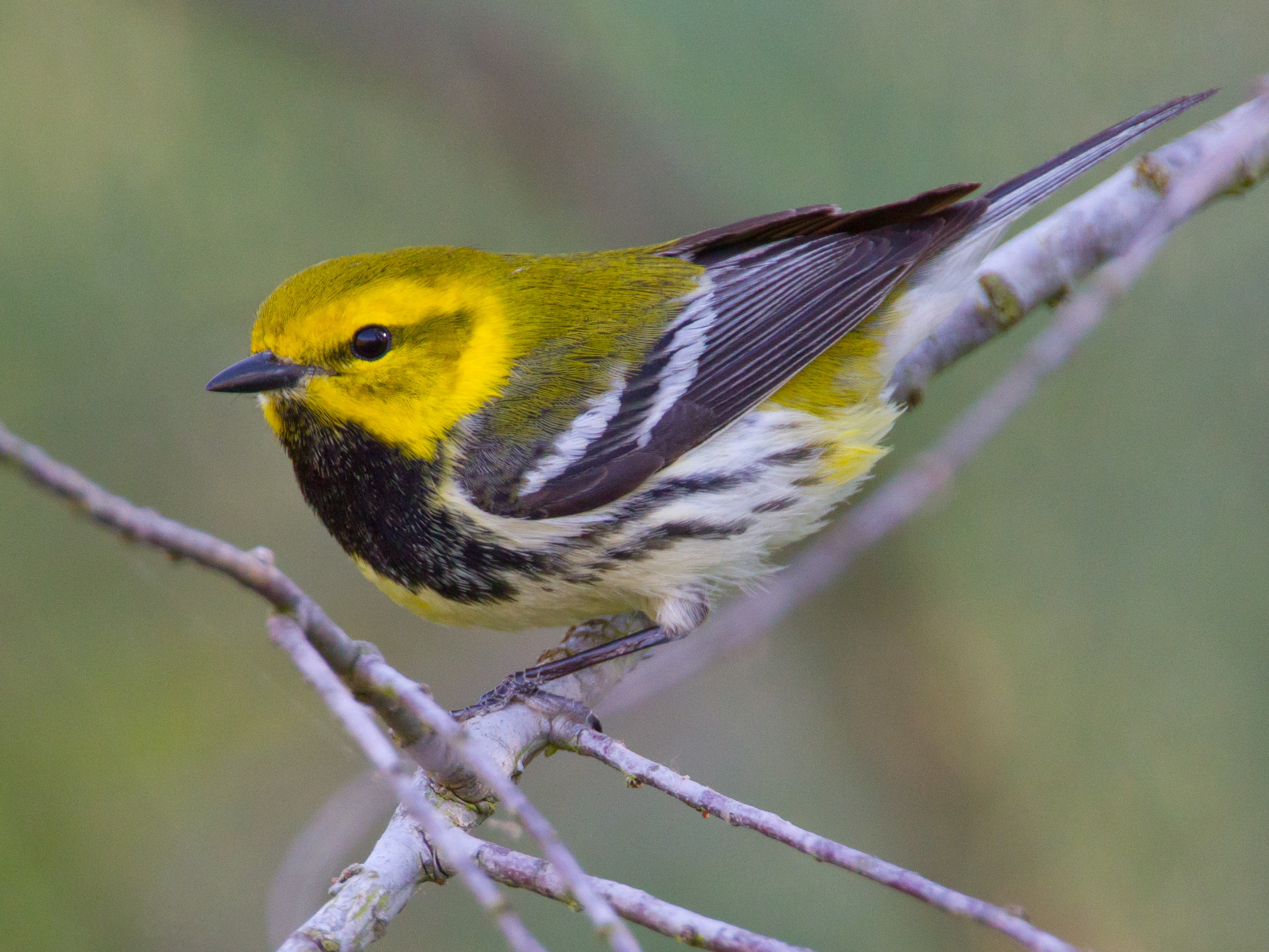
Quintana, Texas Male

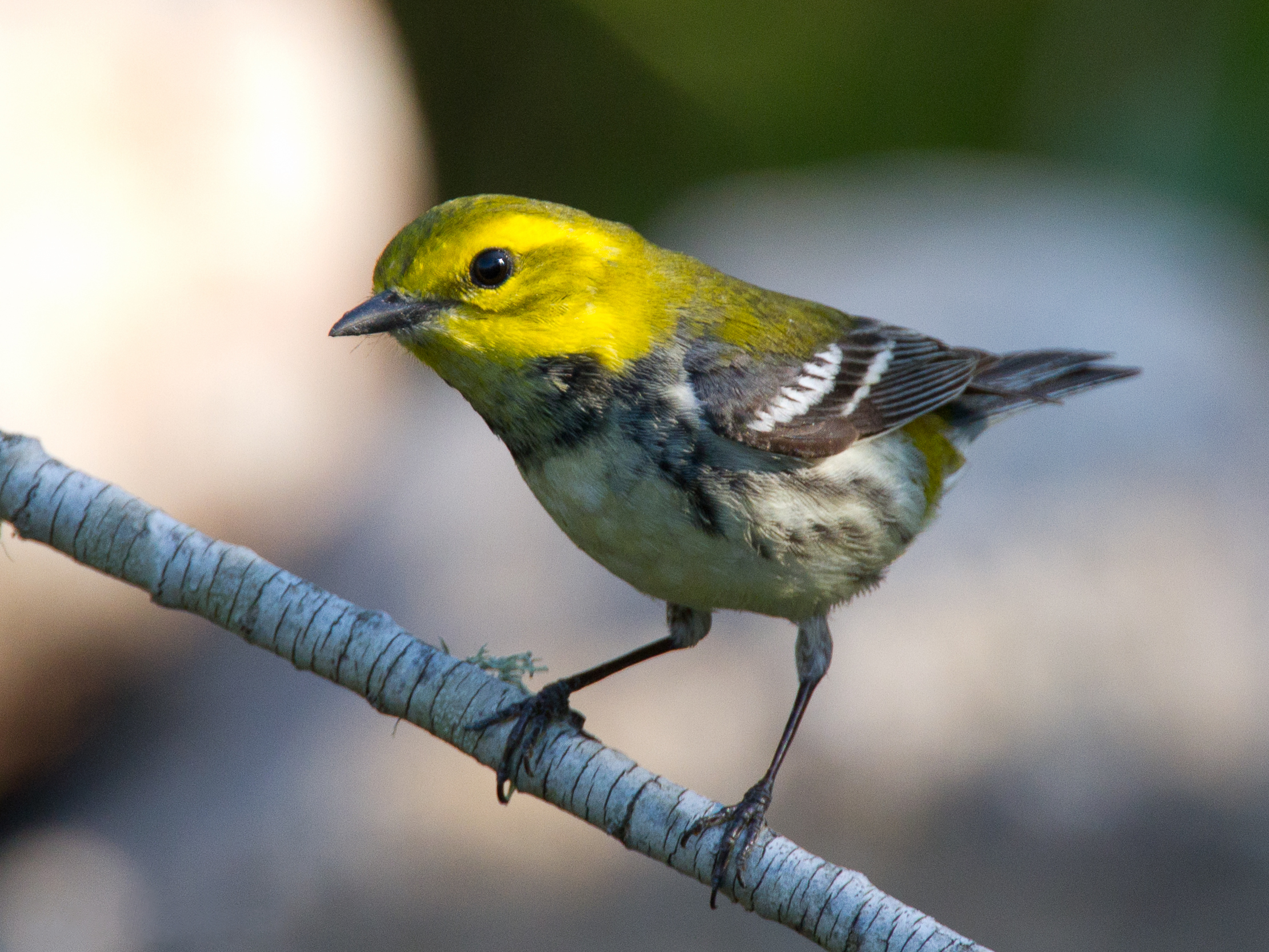
Female black-throated green Warbler

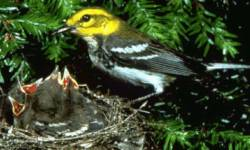
Black-throated green warbler with chicks

== Habitat and distribution ==
The breeding habitat of the black-throated green warbler is coniferous and mixed forests in eastern North America and western Canada and cypress swamps on the southern Atlantic coast, with preference for dense stands of conifers. These birds' nests are open cups, which are usually situated close to the trunk of a tree.

These birds migrate to Mexico, Central America, the West Indies and southern Florida. One destination is to the Petenes mangroves of the Yucatán. Some birds straggle as far as South America, with the southernmost couple of records coming from Ecuador.

== Hybridization ==
The black-throated green warbler has been reported to hybridize with the congeneric Townsend's warbler where their range overlaps in the Rocky Mountains.

== Behavior ==
Black-throated green warblers forage actively in vegetation, and they sometimes hover (gleaning), or catch insects in flight (hawking). Insects are the main constituents of these birds' diets, although berries will occasionally be consumed.

The song of this bird is a buzzed zee-zee-zee-zooo-zeet or zoo-zee-zoo-zoo-zeet. The call is a sharp tsip.

This bird is vulnerable to nest parasitism by the brown-headed cowbird.
