= List of flora and fauna of Acadia National Park =

List of plant and animal species in a U.S. national park

This is a list of the flora and fauna of Acadia National Park, a national park on the coast of Maine, United States. The park's habitats range from bare mountain summits and boreal and deciduous forests to freshwater lakes, wetlands, and the rocky Atlantic shoreline, supporting a diversity of plants and animals.

== Flora ==
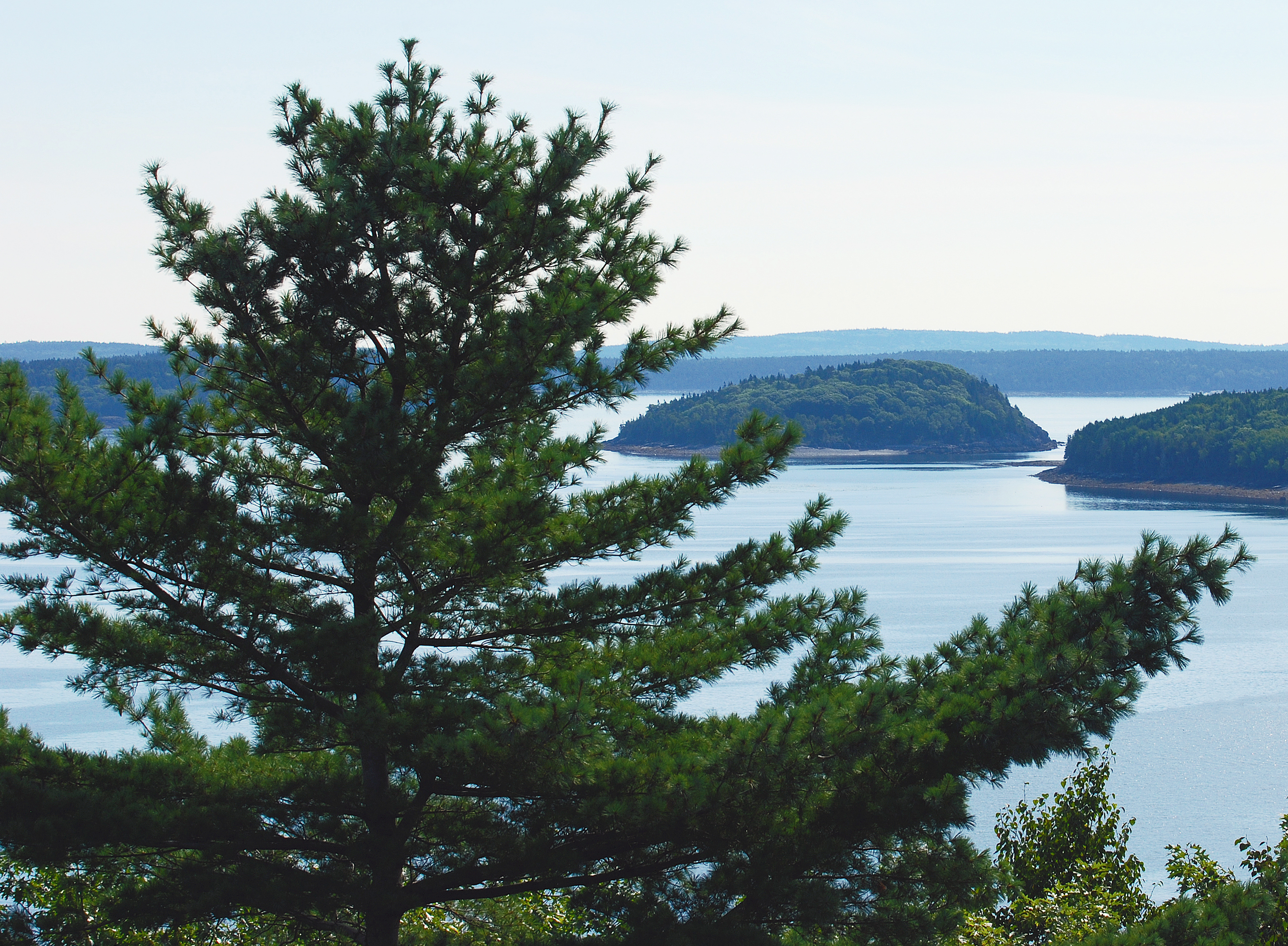
A white pine tree

Flora common to both deciduous and coniferous woodlands include lowbush blueberry, Canadian bunchberry, hobblebush, bluebead lily, Canada mayflower, wild sarsaparilla, shadbush, starflower, rosy twisted stalk, wintergreen, and white pine trees.

Coniferous forest trees include the balsam fir, eastern hemlock, red pine, red spruce, and white spruce. The park has a potential natural vegetation of northeastern spruce/fir within temperate coniferous forests, according to the original A. W. Kuchler types. Spruce-fir forests cover more than sixty percent of the naturally vegetated habitats in the park. Other coniferous forest plants include dewdrop, mountain holly, pinesap, one-flowered pyrola, shinleaf, trailing arbutus, northern woodsorrel, and drooping woodreed.

At least two species of invasive insect have been confirmed on trees in the park. Red pine scale was confirmed on dying red pines on the south side of Norumbega Mountain near Lower Hadlock Pond in 2014. Hemlock woolly adelgid was first found near Northeast Harbor in 2022, and has since spread to Sieur de Monts and the A Murray Young Path.

Deciduous forest trees include the white ash, big-toothed and trembling aspen, American beech, paper and yellow birch, red oak, American mountain ash, as well as mountain, red, striped, and sugar maples. Other deciduous forest plants include large-leaved aster, chokecherry, red-berried elder, Christmas fern, threeleaf goldthread, early saxifrage, false Solomon's seal, small Solomon's seal, and twinflower.

Trees commonly found in the mountains and dry, rocky places of the national park include gray birch, common juniper, jack pine, and pitch pine, while smaller trees, or shrub, species include green alder and pin cherry. Other common shrubs and flowering plants found in the mountains and rocky areas include alpine aster, bearberry, velvetleaf blueberry, bush-honeysuckle, black chokeberry, three-toothed cinquefoil, mountain cranberry, bracken fern, Rand's goldenrod, harebell, golden heather, mountain holly, black huckleberry, creeping juniper, sheep laurel, red raspberry, Virginia rose, mountain sandwort, bristly sarsaparilla, sweetfern, and wild raisin. Poverty oatgrass is the most common grass found in mountainous terrain.

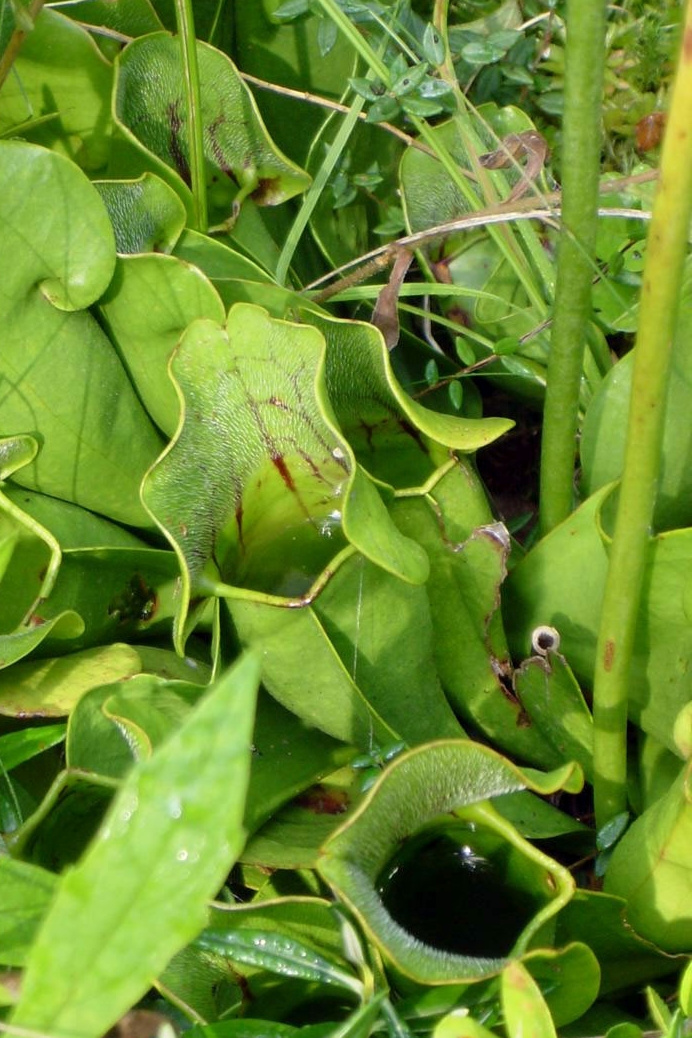
Pitcher plant, a carnivorous species

Bog plants include bog aster, bog rosemary, cottongrass, large cranberry, small cranberry, bog goldenrod, dwarf huckleberry, blue flag, Labrador-tea, bog laurel, leatherleaf, pitcher plant, rhodora, bristly rose, creeping snowberry, round-leaved sundew, spatulate-leaved sundew, and sweetgale, along with larch and black spruce trees.

Meadow and roadside plants include speckled alder, flat-topped white aster, New York aster, blue-eyed-grass, azure bluet, spreading dogbane, fireweed, gray goldenrod, rough-stemmed goldenrod, wavy hair-grass, hardhack, whorled loosestrife, tall meadow-rue, meadowsweet, common milkweed, pearly everlasting, wild strawberry, and yellow rattle.

Freshwater marsh and pond plants include common arrowhead, horned bladderwort, highbush blueberry, bluejoint, common cattail, water lobelia, pickerelweed, marsh St. John's wort, swamp candles, swamp rose, white turtlehead, fragrant water-lily, and yellow water-lily.

The Mount Desert Island section of the park harbors more than half of the vascular plant species occurring in Maine. Plant, algal, and fungal specimens collected during research activities at the park are deposited for future study at a herbarium jointly administered by the park and the College of the Atlantic. A special garden called The Wild Gardens of Acadia was established in the Sieur de Monts area of the park in 1961 and has since grown to include more than 400 indigenous plant species found throughout all park areas.

== Fauna ==
The park's wide variety of natural habitats provides homes for many different animal species. The coastal location also encourages a large number of species; however, the small size and isolation of these habitats from mainland habitats limits the types of animals, especially their size. Smaller animals are better adapted to smaller habitats which makes them more common and easily observed than larger ones such as black bears and moose.

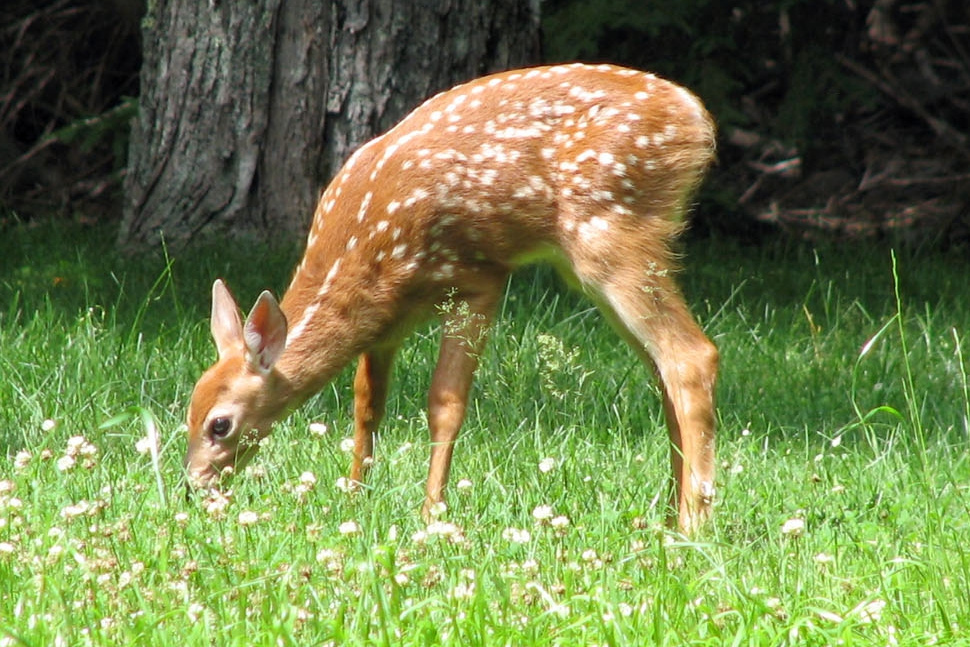
White-tailed deer fawn

The park is inhabited by 37 mammalian species:

- carnivores – black bear, coyote, red fox (black, red, silver, and cross color variants), raccoon, North American river otter, fisher, American mink, short-tailed and long-tailed weasels
- ungulates – moose and white-tailed deer
- rodents – beaver, groundhog, porcupine, southern red-backed vole, five mouse species (white-footed, deer, southern bog lemming, woodland jumping and meadow jumping mouse), three squirrel species (northern flying, eastern gray, and red squirrel), and the eastern chipmunk
- shrews/moles – five shrew species (northern short-tailed, masked, smoky, pygmy, and water shrews), and the star-nosed mole
- bats – big brown, little brown, silver-haired, eastern red, hoary, and the northern long-eared bat (the fungal disease known as white-nose syndrome was confirmed in park bats in 2012)

and a solitary native hare species, the snowshoe hare.

Seven reptilian species live in the park including five snakes (milk, smooth green, redbelly, eastern garter, and the ring-necked snake) and two turtles (the common snapping turtle and the eastern painted turtle).

Eleven amphibian species inhabit the park including the American toad, five frog species (bullfrog, spring peeper, green, pickerel, and wood frog), four salamander species (spotted, dusky, northern two-lined, and four-toed salamander), and the eastern newt.

The most abundant fish are the American eel, golden shiner, banded killifish, and pumpkinseed, while commonly found fish include alewife, white sucker, northern redbelly dace, chain pickerel (non-native), three-spined stickleback, nine-spined stickleback, rainbow smelt, and brook trout. Thirteen other fish species (ten non-native) are listed by the NPS as uncommon, while eight other species are listed with an unknown abundance.

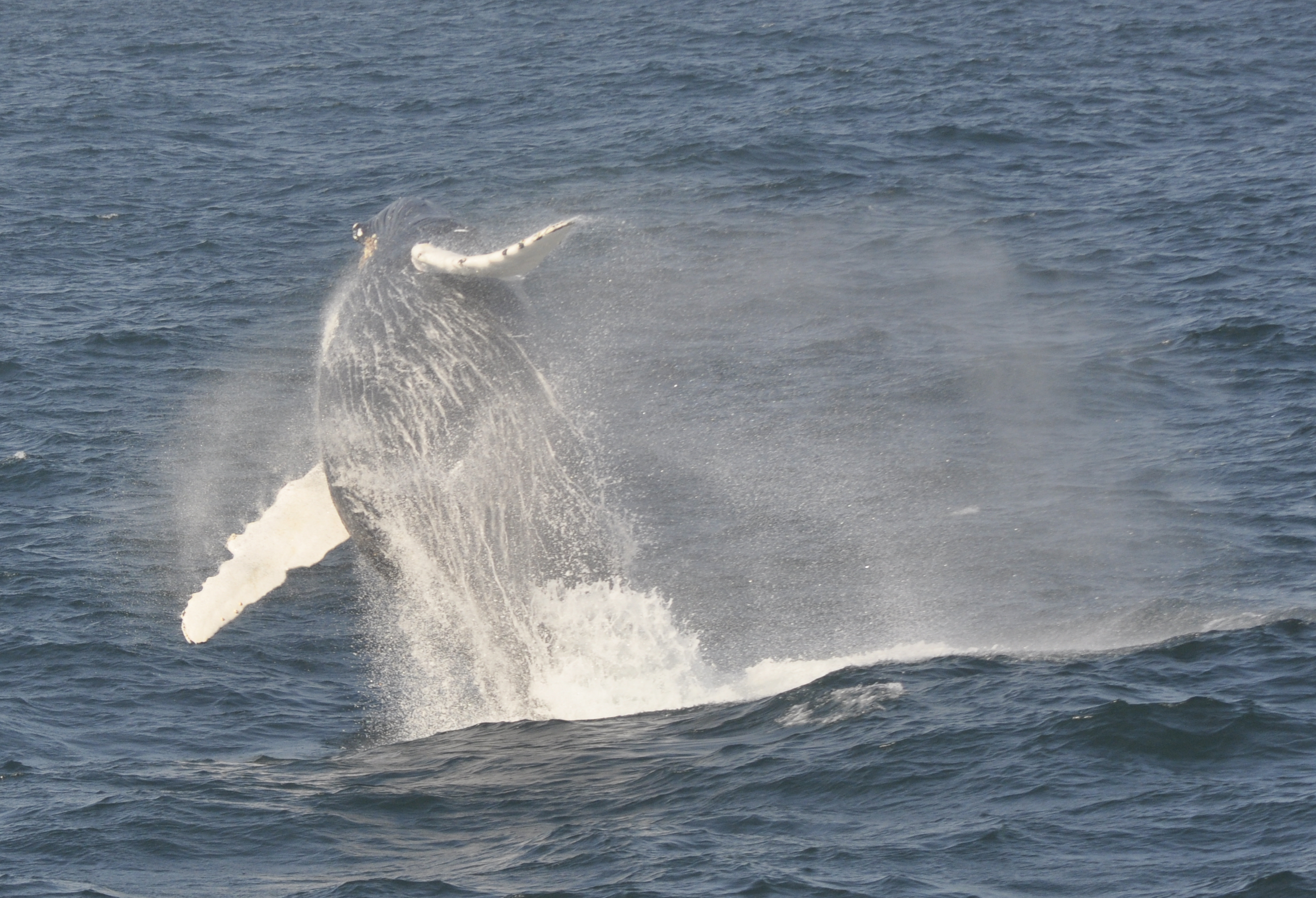
Humpback whale breaching

Many marine species may be observed in the surrounding waters, including seals and whales, from a sea kayak or other personal watercraft, or on ranger-narrated boat cruises. Special whale-watching excursions launch from Bar Harbor.

A total of 215 bird species, including migratory birds, are present at some time during the year. An additional 116 species are possibly present but unconfirmed, making a total of 331 potential species. Thirty-three other bird species are considered historical and no longer present in the park. Large birds include golden and bald eagles, gyrfalcons, turkey vultures, ospreys, cormorants, and various herons, hawks, and owls. Waterfowl species include four geese (Canada, brant, snow, and greater white-fronted geese), along with various ducks including mallards, wood ducks, pintails, wigeons, blue-winged and green-winged teals, canvasbacks, buffleheads, eiders, goldeneyes, and harlequin ducks. Seabirds include terns and four gull species (herring, laughing, ring-billed, and great black-backed gulls), while shorebirds include avocets, sandpipers and plovers. Songbirds are represented by various species of blackbirds, chickadees, finches, jays, sparrows, swallows, thrushes, vireos, warblers, and wrens.

One of the more unique songbirds is the red crossbill, a finch that uses its crossed mandibles to efficiently extract the seeds from conifer cones, especially those of spruces, hemlocks, and pines. The crossbills feed their young with the same seeds, rather than the insects which other species feed to their chicks. Any given subspecies of the crossbill (as many as ten are known in North America) will have the same bill size, utilize the same calls to communicate, and prefer certain cones, with smaller-billed birds preferring the smaller cones of hemlocks and larger-billed birds preferring the larger cones of white pines.

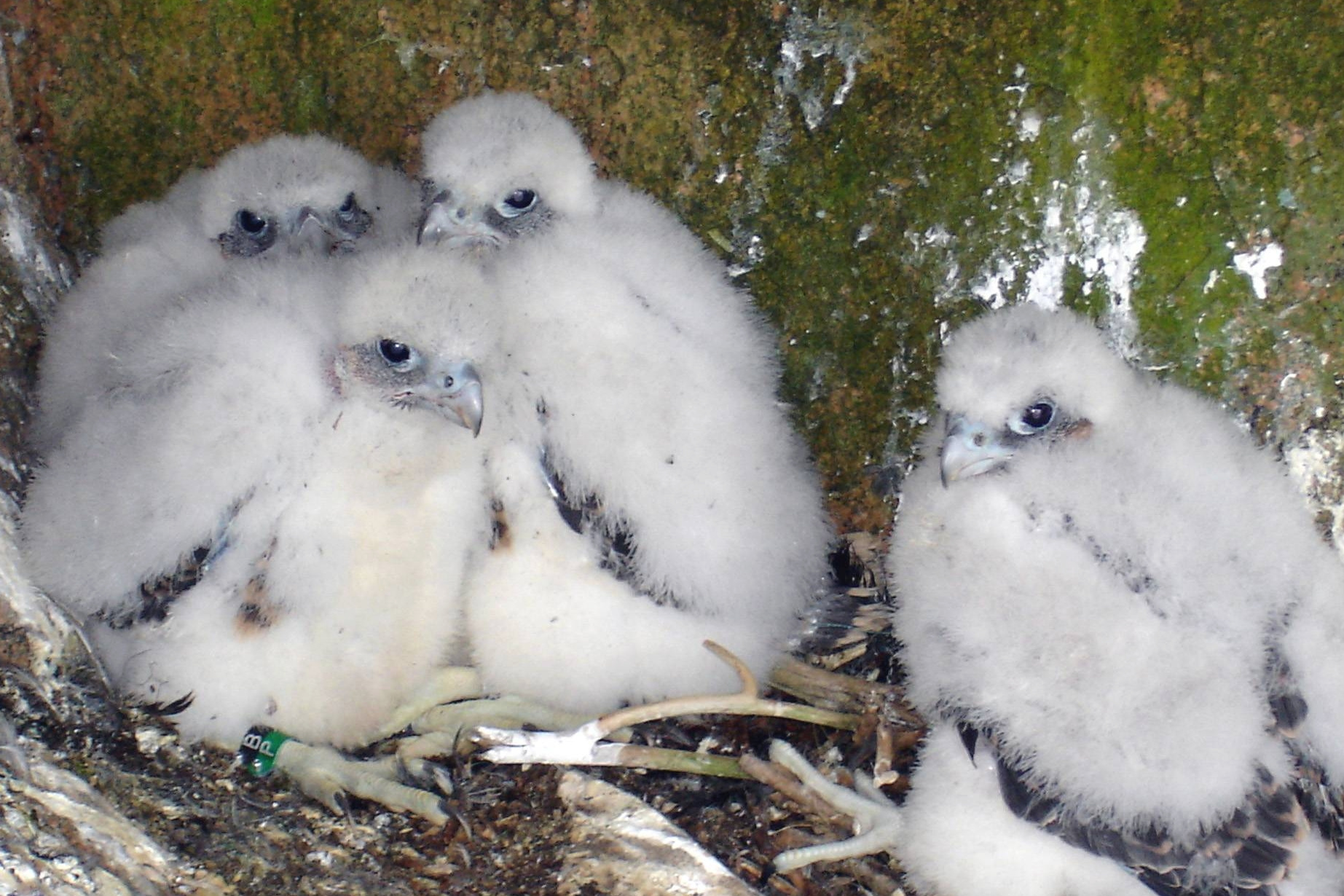
Banded peregrine falcon chicks

In 1991, peregrine falcons had a successful nesting in Acadia for the first time since 1956. At least one pair and as many as four pairs have produced offspring over the years since 1991, totaling more than 160 chicks. Many of those chicks were banded to learn about migration, habitat use, and longevity. Banded falcons have been observed as far away as Vermont, Maryland, Washington, D.C., and New Brunswick. Beginning in early spring and continuing into mid-summer, certain trails may be closed to avoid disturbance to falcon nesting areas. The Jordan Cliffs Trail, Valley Cove Trail, Precipice Trail, and a portion of the Orange and Black Path were closed from April 13 to July 13, 2018. The same trails were closed from March 22 to August 3, 2017.

== See also ==
- List of birds of Acadia National Park
- Acadia National Park
