= Euphagus magnirostris =

Euphagus magnirostris Temporal range: Late Pleistocene

Scientific classification
- Domain: Eukaryota
- Kingdom: Animalia
- Phylum: Chordata
- Class: Aves
- Order: Passeriformes
- Family: Icteridae
- Genus: Euphagus
- Species: †E. magnirostris

Binomial name
- †Euphagus magnirostris Miller, 1929

Extinct species of bird

Euphagus magnirostris is an extinct species of bird in the family Icteridae. It is sometimes called the large-billed blackbird or big-billed blackbird. It is known from Late Pleistocene fossils found in the La Brea Tar Pits of California, as well as the Talara Tar Seeps of northwestern Peru and the Mene de Inciarte Tar Seep of Venezuela. E. magnirostris was named on the basis of a lower mandible from La Brea; this portion most resembles that of the living Brewer's blackbird (Euphagus cyanocephalus), but is larger and stockier. The rest of the skeleton is, as far as is known, similar to E. cyanocephalus.
