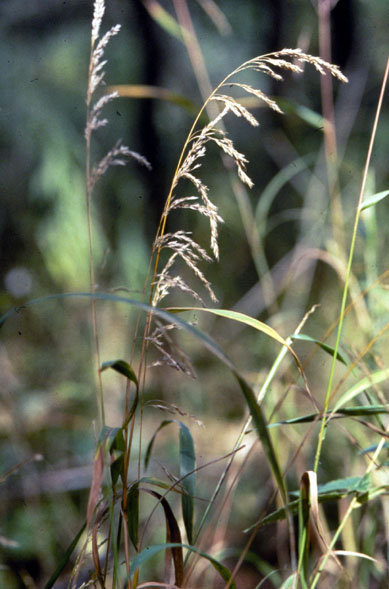
- Cinna arundinacea

Scientific classification
- Kingdom: Plantae
- Clade: Tracheophytes
- Clade: Angiosperms
- Clade: Monocots
- Clade: Commelinids
- Order: Poales
- Family: Poaceae
- Subfamily: Pooideae
- Supertribe: Poodae
- Tribe: Poeae
- Subtribe: Cinninae
- Genus: Cinna; L.

Type species
- Cinna arundinacea L.

Synonyms
- Blyttia Fr. 1839, illegitimate homonym not Arn. 1838 nor Endl. 1840; Cinnastrum E.Fourn.

= Cinna (plant) =

Woodreeds

Genus of grasses

Cinna is a small genus of grasses known by the common name woodreeds. There are only four known species, but they are quite widespread in the Americas and northern Eurasia.

Woodreeds are perennial grasses with long, soft panicle inflorescences. They are found in moist areas, especially near bodies of water.

== Species ==
- Cinna arundinacea - sweet woodreed, stout woodreed - eastern Canada, eastern & central United States
- Cinna bolanderi - Bolander's woodreed - central California (Fresno, Tulare, Mariposa counties)
- Cinna latifolia - drooping woodreed - northern Eurasia from Norway to Japan & Magadan; Canada incl Arctic territories; northern & western United States
- Cinna poiformis - Mexico, Central America, Venezuela, Colombia, Peru, Ecuador, Bolivia

=== Formerly included ===
Species now considered better suited to other genera: Agrostis, Andropogon, Arctagrostis, Calamagrostis, Dichelachne, Echinopogon, Limnodea, Muhlenbergia, Pogonatherum, and Sporobolus

== See also ==
- List of Poaceae genera
