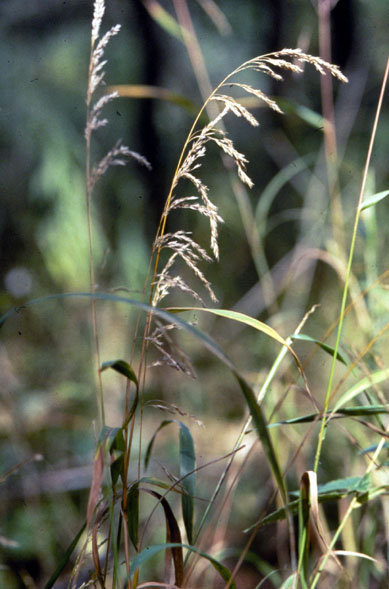
- Habit
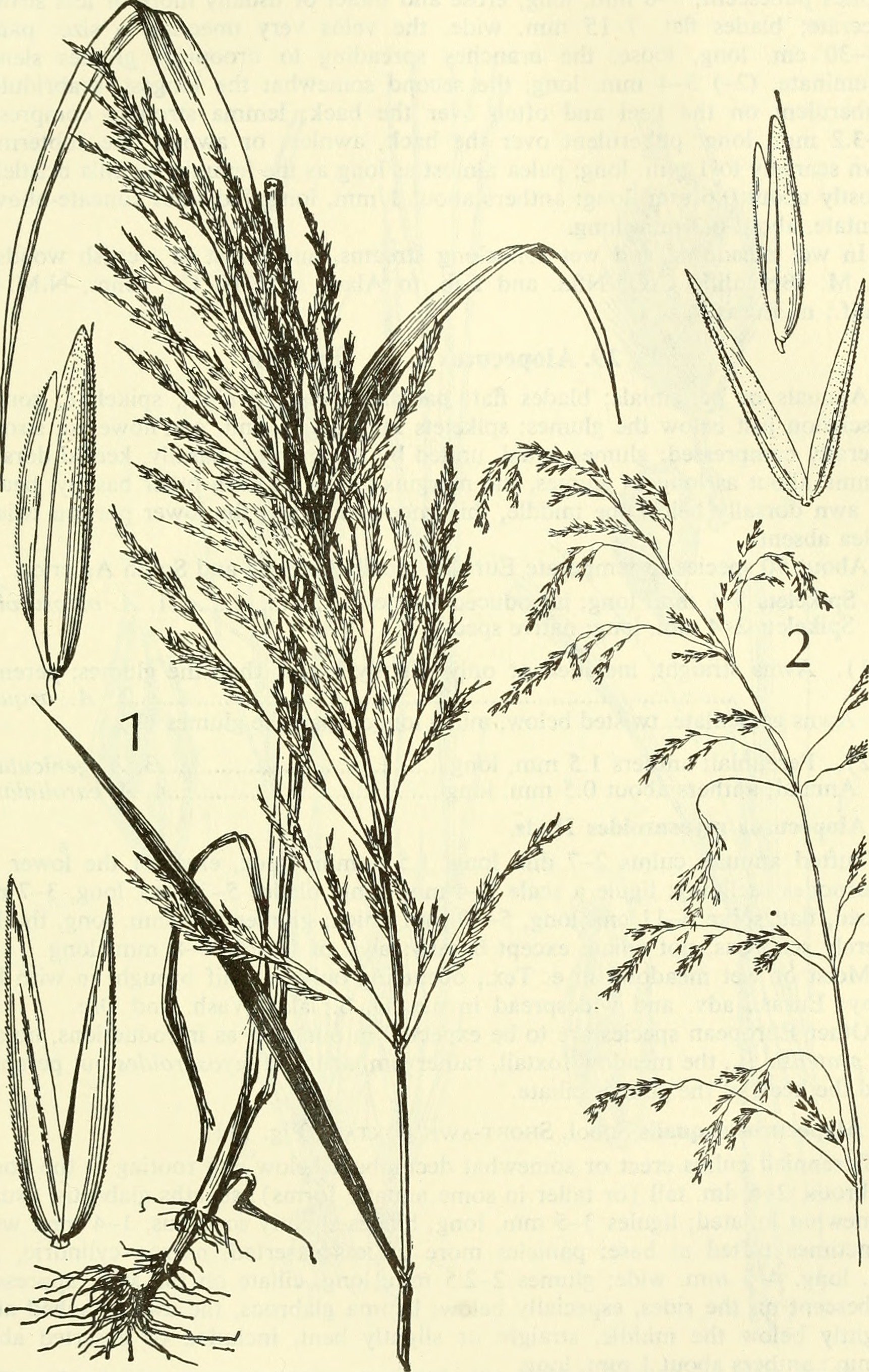
- Botanical illustration

Scientific classification
- Kingdom: Plantae
- Clade: Tracheophytes
- Clade: Angiosperms
- Clade: Monocots
- Clade: Commelinids
- Order: Poales
- Family: Poaceae
- Subfamily: Pooideae
- Genus: Cinna
- Species: C. arundinacea

Binomial name
- Cinna arundinacea L.

Synonyms
- Agrostis cinna Retz.; Agrostis rubicunda Bosc ex Desv.; Cinna agrostidea P.Beauv. ex Steud.; Cinna arundinacea var. inexpansa Fernald & Griscom; Imperata saccharifera André; Muhlenbergia cinna (Retz.) Trin.

= Cinna arundinacea =

Species of plant

Cinna arundinacea, the stout woodreed or sweet woodreed, is a species of flowering plant in the grass family Poaceae. It is native to Canada and the United States east of the Rockies. A perennial reaching 6 ft (1.8 m), it is usually found growing in wet areas.
