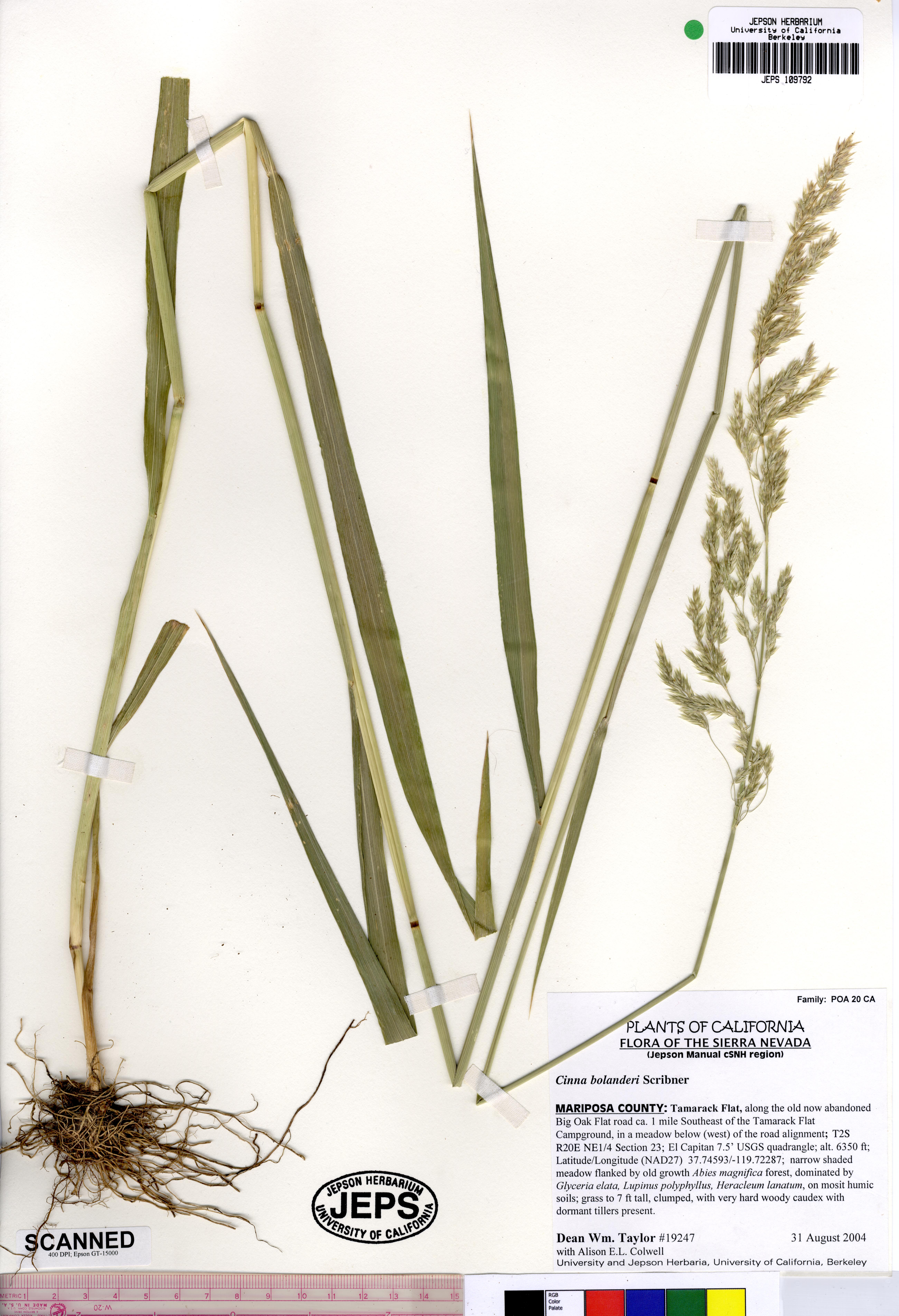

Conservation status
- Imperiled (NatureServe)

Scientific classification
- Kingdom: Plantae
- Clade: Tracheophytes
- Clade: Angiosperms
- Clade: Monocots
- Clade: Commelinids
- Order: Poales
- Family: Poaceae
- Subfamily: Pooideae
- Genus: Cinna
- Species: C. bolanderi

Binomial name
- Cinna bolanderi Scribn.

= Cinna bolanderi =

Species of grass

Cinna bolanderi is a species of grass known by the common names Bolander's woodreed and Sierran woodreed. It is endemic to the Sierra Nevada of California, where it grows in meadows and forest, especially in moist areas. It can reach two meters in height and has a spreading inflorescence of spikelets. It blooms in late summer and fall.
