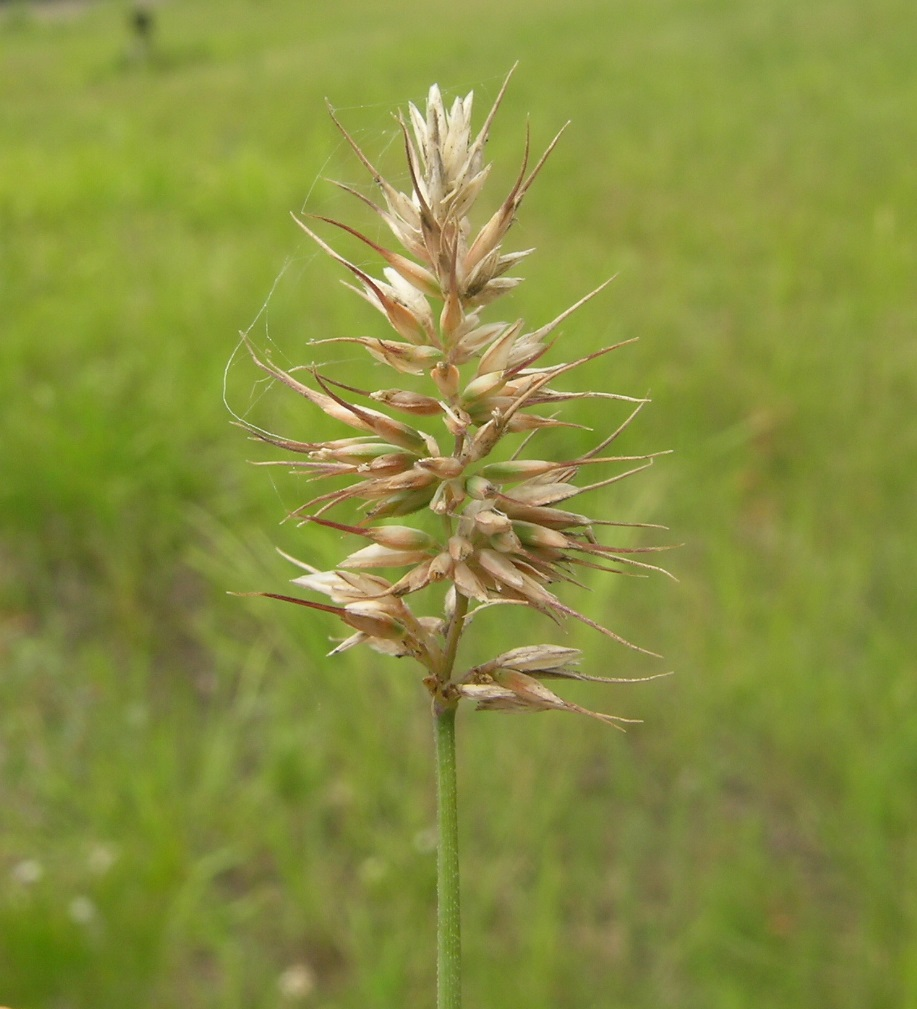

Scientific classification
- Kingdom: Plantae
- Clade: Tracheophytes
- Clade: Angiosperms
- Clade: Monocots
- Clade: Commelinids
- Order: Poales
- Family: Poaceae
- Subfamily: Pooideae
- Genus: Echinopogon
- Species: E. caespitosus

Binomial name
- Echinopogon caespitosus C.E.Hubb.

= Echinopogon caespitosus =

Species of plant

Echinopogon caespitosus, the bushy hedgehog grass or tufted hedgehog grass, is a species of grass native to southeastern Australia. It is often found in disturbed areas. The original specimen was collected at Katoomba railway station in 1931, and published in Icones Plantarum in 1934 by Charles Hubbard. The grass may grow to 1.5 metres, and is noticeable due to its dense, bristly head. The specific epithet is derived from Latin, meaning tufted.

Two varieties are currently recognised:

- Echinopogon caespitosus var. caespitosus
- Echinopogon caespitosus var. cunninghamii
