= Echinopogon cheelii =

Scientific classification
- Kingdom: Plantae
- Clade: Tracheophytes
- Clade: Angiosperms
- Clade: Monocots
- Clade: Commelinids
- Order: Poales
- Family: Poaceae
- Subfamily: Pooideae
- Genus: Echinopogon
- Species: E. cheelii

Binomial name
- Echinopogon cheelii C.E.Hubb.
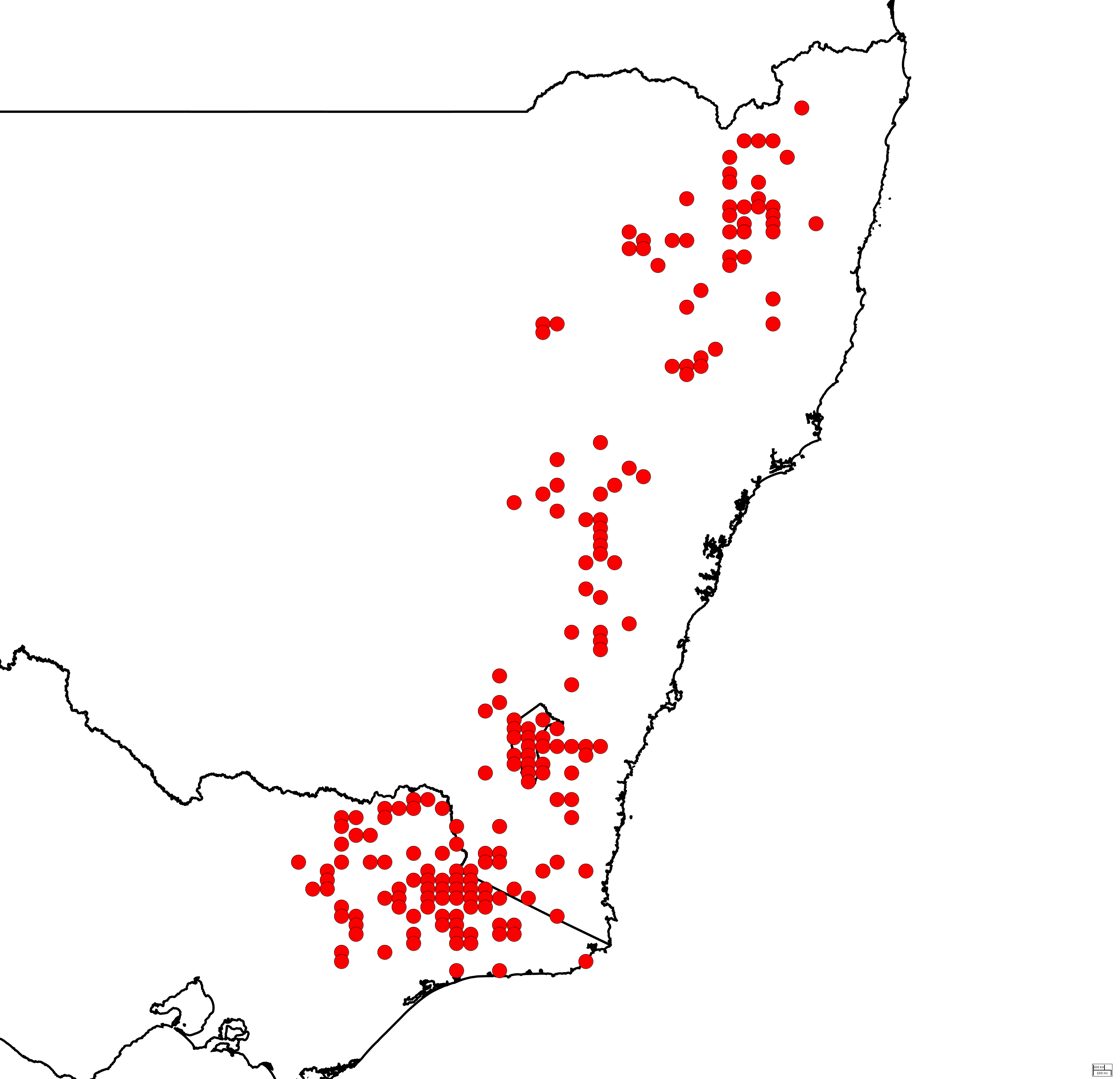
- Distribution data for Echinopogon cheelii across New South Wales and Victoria from the Australasian Virtual Herbarium

Species of grass

Echinopogon cheelii, commonly known as longflower hedgehog grass, is a species of grass endemic to southeastern Australia.

== Description ==
Echinopogon cheelii is a loosely tufted perennial grass that grows up to 1.1 m (3 ft 7 in) in height.

The leaf-blades are linear or lanceolate, 3–14 cm (1.2–5.5 in) long, and 4–10 mm (0.16–0.39 in) wide. The surface is generally hairless but sometimes has very soft hairs.

The panicle is ovate or ovate-oblong generally (with smaller panicles forming a dense, triangular shape), 20–60 mm (0.79–2.36 in) long and 10–30 mm (0.39–1.18 in) wide including awns. Spiketlets are 6–10 mm (0.24–0.39 in) long and either erect or slightly spreading below. Glumes are acute to acuminate and firmly membranous. The keel is rigidly ciliate and scabrid. Lemma is typically longer than glumes. It is linear-lanceolate in shape.

== Distribution and habitat ==
Echinopogon cheelii occurs across the Australian states of New South Wales and Victoria.

In New South Wales, E. cheelii is observed to occur in damp places within forests and grasslands... In Victoria, it is associated with dryish elevated forests and shallow rocky soils.
