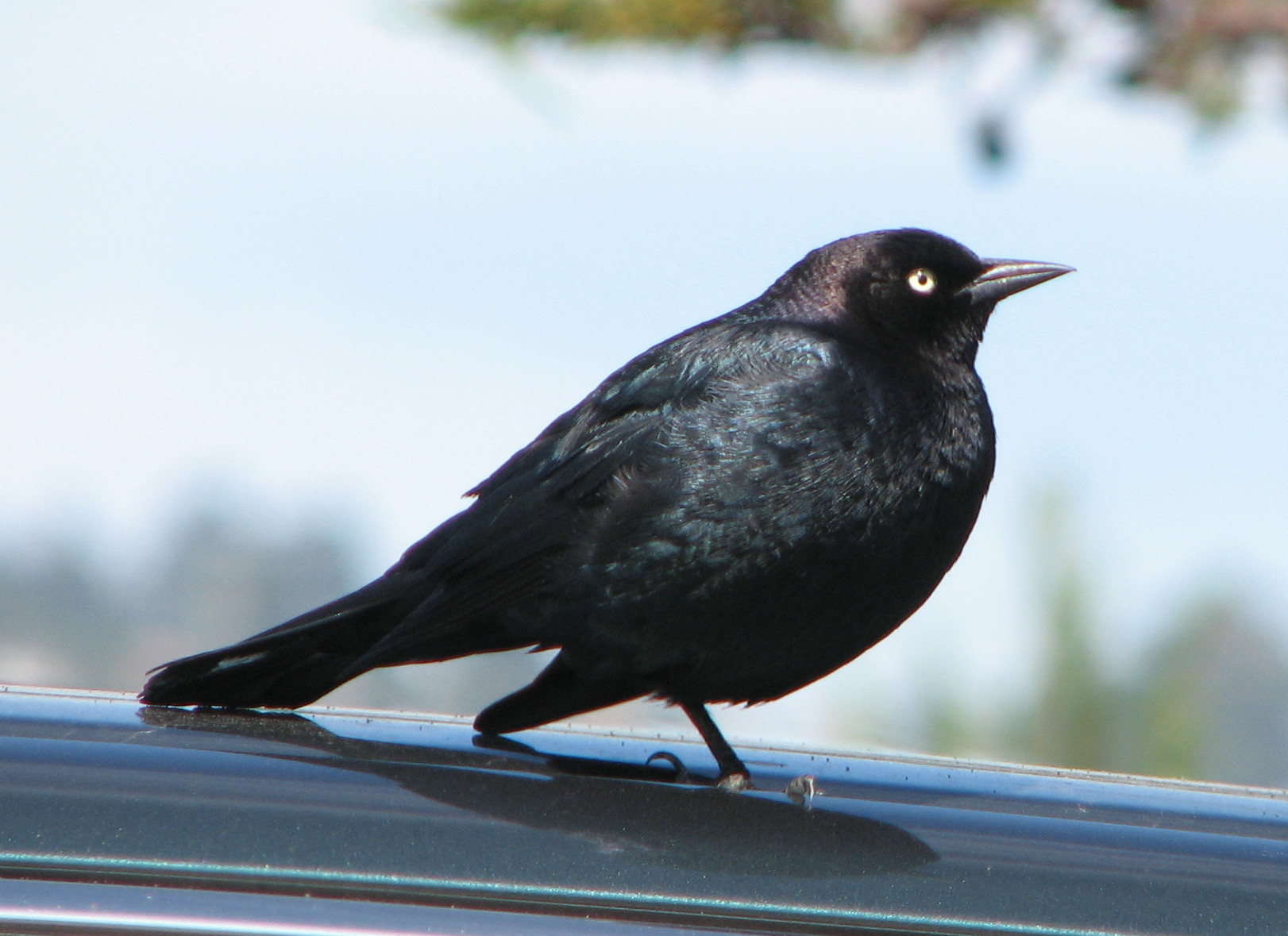
- Male Brewer's blackbird

Scientific classification
- Kingdom: Animalia
- Phylum: Chordata
- Class: Aves
- Order: Passeriformes
- Family: Icteridae
- Genus: Euphagus; Cassin, 1867

Type species
- Psarocolius cyanocephalus Wagler, 1829

Species
- E. carolinus E. cyanocephalus †E. magnirostris

= Euphagus =

Euphagus Temporal range: Late Pleistocene - Recent

Genus of birds

Euphagus is a small genus of American blackbirds. It contains two extant species: Brewer's blackbird, Euphagus cyanocephalus, and rusty blackbird E. carolinus.

The living species are very similar medium-sized birds. Adult males have mainly black plumage and a bright yellow eye; females are dark gray-brown.

== Extant species ==
Genus Euphagus – Cassin, 1867 – two species
Common name	Scientific name and subspecies	Range	Size and ecology	IUCN status and estimated population
Brewer's blackbird	Euphagus cyanocephalus (Wagler, 1829)	Breeds across central and western North America; often permanent residents in the west, with other birds migrating to the southeastern United States and Mexico; expanding east in the Great Lakes region	Size: 20–26 cm (8–10.3 in); 63 g (2.2 oz); wingspan 39 cm (15.5 in) Habitat: Open and semi-open areas, often near water, including parking lots and around schools; also marshlands and forests; from below sea level in Southern California up to 2,400 m (8,000 ft); nests in colonies of up to 30 pairs in treetops, or in reeds and other freshwater plants near water Diet: Forages on the ground, in fields and in shallow water; mainly seeds and insects, some berries; sometimes catches insects in flight, and occasionally eats small mammals, amphibians and nestlings of other birds; feeds in flocks outside the breeding season, sometimes with other blackbirds	NT Decreasing; 57% decline from 1966 to 2019; about 23 million individuals
Rusty blackbird	Euphagus carolinus (Müller, 1776)	Breeds in the boreal forest and muskeg across Canada, New England, the Upper Peninsula of Michigan, the Adirondack Mountains of New York and Alaska; migrates to the eastern and southeastern United States, into parts of the Grain Belt, sometimes straying into Mexico; vagrants reported in Greenland and Siberia	Size: 22–25 cm (8.5–9.8 in); 60 g (2.1 oz); wingspan 36 cm (14 in) Habitat: Wet temperate coniferous forests and muskeg; nests in a tree or dense shrub at the edge of ponds and wetlands, often over water; in winter largest concentrations are in the lower Mississippi Valley, with smaller concentrations in the Piedmont and south Atlantic coastal plain Diet: Forages on wet ground or in shallow water; in the breeding season insects (emerging dragonflies and their larvae are important), crustaceans and small fish; more flexible in winter, taking grains (corn and rice), other seeds and the mast of pecans and oaks; feeds in flocks during migration and winter, sometimes with other blackbirds	VU Decreasing; 85–98% decline over the past 40 years

A prehistoric relative, Euphagus magnirostris, is known from Late Pleistocene fossils found in the famous tar seeps of Rancho La Brea, California, as well as the Talara Tar Seeps of northwestern Peru and the Mene de Inciarte Tar Seep of Venezuela. It may have been a close associate of Pleistocene megafauna communities and went extinct following the collapse of the megafauna populations.

== Description ==
Both are migratory, wintering in the southern United States and Mexico, although some Brewer's blackbirds are present all year in the western US.

They build cup nests, and the female alone incubates the eggs. They are gregarious outside the breeding season.

Both species feed on seeds and insects, the rusty having a particularly high insect component to its diet. The fortunes of the two species are contrasting, with Brewer's expanding east in the Great Lakes region, while rusty shows a worrying decline in numbers.
