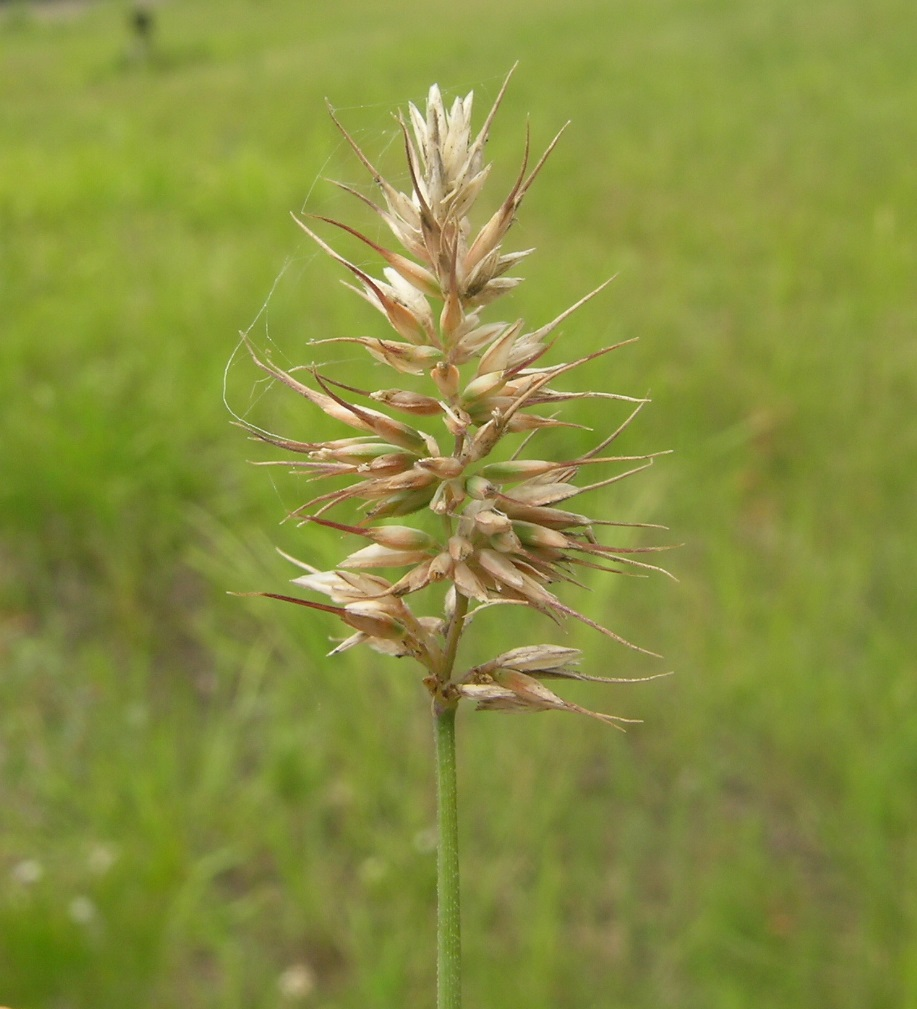
- Echinopogon caespitosus

Scientific classification
- Kingdom: Plantae
- Clade: Tracheophytes
- Clade: Angiosperms
- Clade: Monocots
- Clade: Commelinids
- Order: Poales
- Family: Poaceae
- Subfamily: Pooideae
- Supertribe: Poodae
- Tribe: Poeae
- Subtribe: Echinopogoninae
- Genus: Echinopogon; P.Beauv.

Type species
- Agrostis ovata (syn. of Echinopogon ovatus) G.Forst.

Synonyms
- Hystericina Steud.

= Echinopogon =

Genus of grasses

Echinopogon is a genus of grasses native to Australia, New Guinea, Indonesia, and New Zealand. They are known commonly as hedgehog grasses.

They are perennial grasses with bristly panicles.

Species

- Echinopogon caespitosus - bushy hedgehog grass, tufted hedgehog grass - Queensland, New South Wales, Victoria
- Echinopogon cheelii - longflower hedgehog grass - New South Wales, Victoria
- Echinopogon intermedius - erect hedgehog grass - Queensland, New South Wales
- Echinopogon mckiei - New South Wales
- Echinopogon nutans - Queensland, New South Wales, New Guinea
- Echinopogon ovatus - forest hedgehog grass - New Guinea, Australia (all 6 states plus Norfolk Island), Lesser Sunda Islands, New Zealand (North + South + Chatham Islands)
- Echinopogon phleoides - Northern Tablelands of New South Wales

formerly included

see Calamagrostis

- Echinopogon gunnianus - Calamagrostis gunniana
