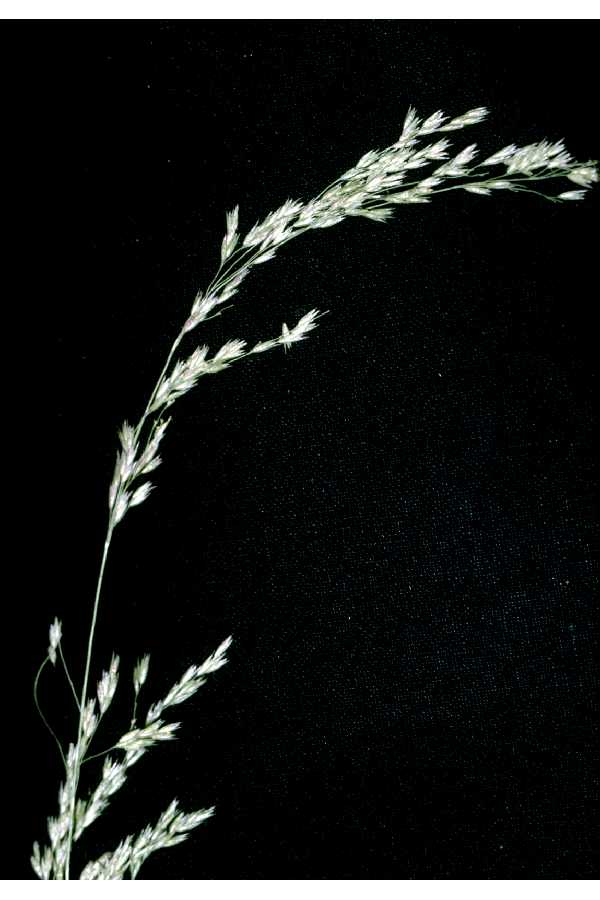

Conservation status
- Secure (NatureServe)

Scientific classification
- Kingdom: Plantae
- Clade: Tracheophytes
- Clade: Angiosperms
- Clade: Monocots
- Clade: Commelinids
- Order: Poales
- Family: Poaceae
- Subfamily: Pooideae
- Genus: Cinna
- Species: C. latifolia

Binomial name
- Cinna latifolia (Trevis. ex Goepp.) Griseb.

= Cinna latifolia =

Species of flowering plant

Cinna latifolia is a species of grass known by the common name drooping woodreed. It is a native bunchgrass to the Northern Hemisphere, where it has a circumboreal distribution. It grows in moist habitat, such as forest understory and riverbanks. It reaches nearly two meters in maximum height. The inflorescence is an open array of spikelets generally green to purple-tinted in color. It flowers in late summer and fall.
