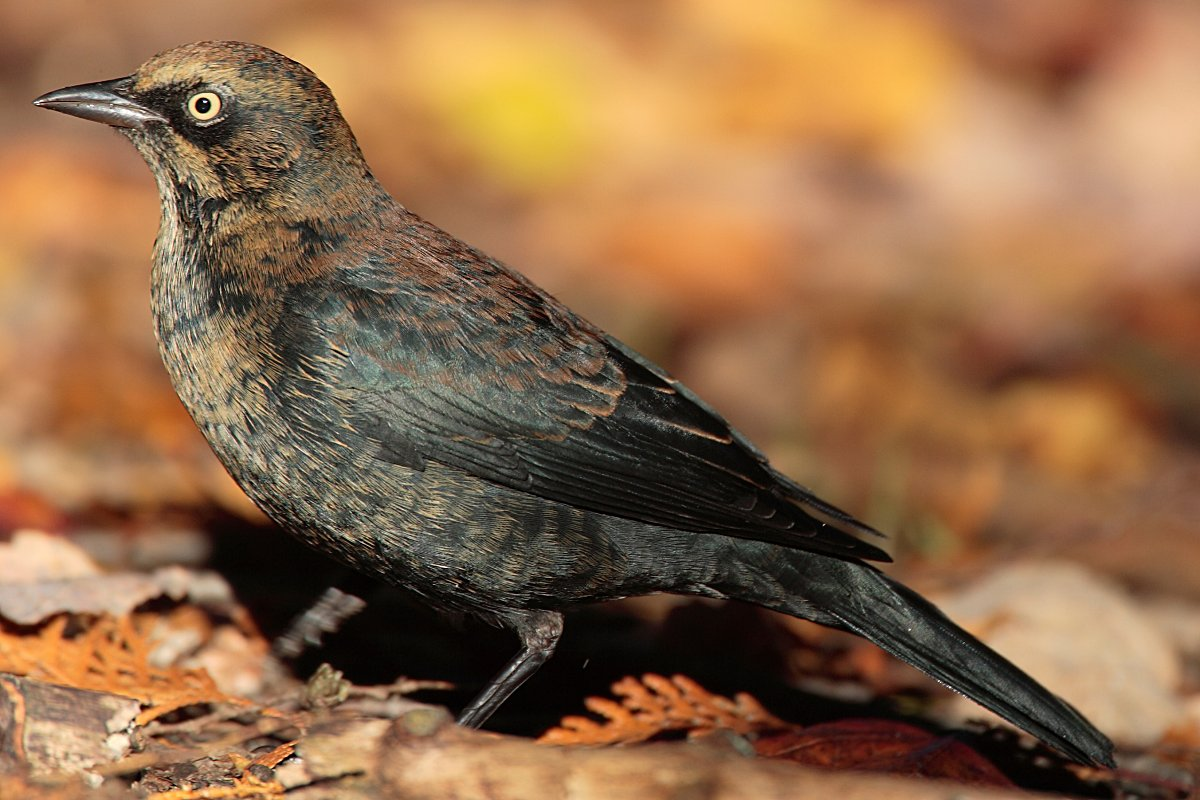
- Male in non-breeding plumage
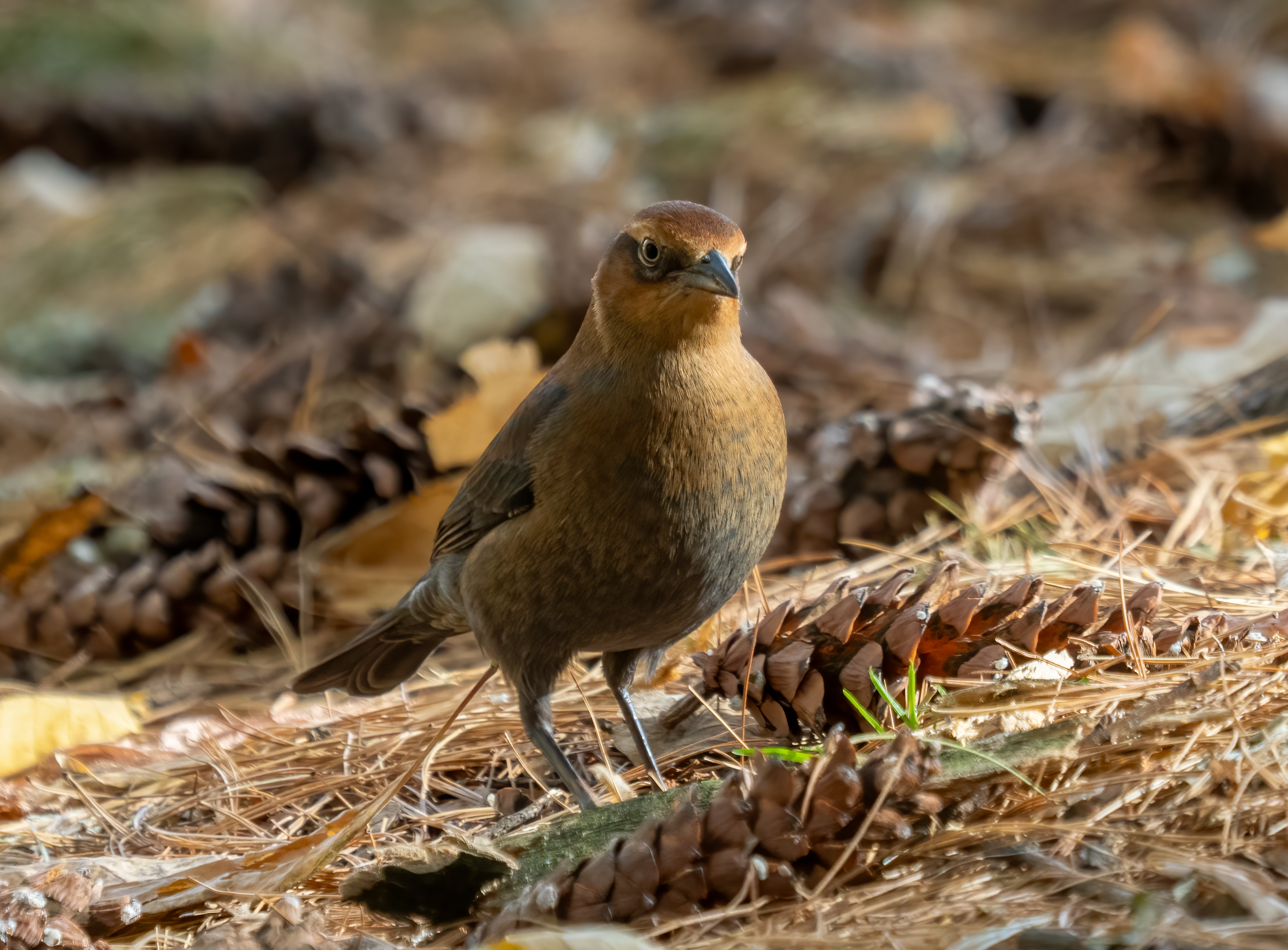
- Female

Conservation status
- Vulnerable (IUCN 3.1)

- Apparently Secure (NatureServe)

Scientific classification
- Kingdom: Animalia
- Phylum: Chordata
- Class: Aves
- Order: Passeriformes
- Family: Icteridae
- Genus: Euphagus
- Species: E. carolinus

Binomial name
- Euphagus carolinus (Muller, 1776)
- Range of E. carolinus Breeding range Wintering range

= Rusty blackbird =

Species of bird

The rusty blackbird (Euphagus carolinus) is a medium-sized New World blackbird, closely related to grackles ("rusty grackle" is an older name for the species). It is a bird that prefers wet forested areas, breeding in the boreal forest and muskeg across northern Canada, and migrating southeast to the United States during winter.

Formerly abundant, the rusty blackbird has undergone one of the most rapid declines of any abundant bird species in North America in recent years, for reasons that are not well understood.

== Description ==
Adults have a pointed bill and a pale yellow eye. They have black plumage with faint green and purple gloss; the female is greyer. "Rusty" refers to the brownish winter plumage. They resemble the western member of the same genus, the Brewer's blackbird; however, Brewer's has a longer bill and the male's head is iridescent green.

Standard Measurements
length	8.5–9.8 in (220–250 mm)
weight	60 g (2.1 oz)
wingspan	14 in (360 mm)
wing	110.5–117.4 mm (4.35–4.62 in)
tail	85–94.5 mm (3.35–3.72 in)
culmen	19–21.9 mm (0.75–0.86 in)
tarsus	29.5–33 mm (1.16–1.30 in)

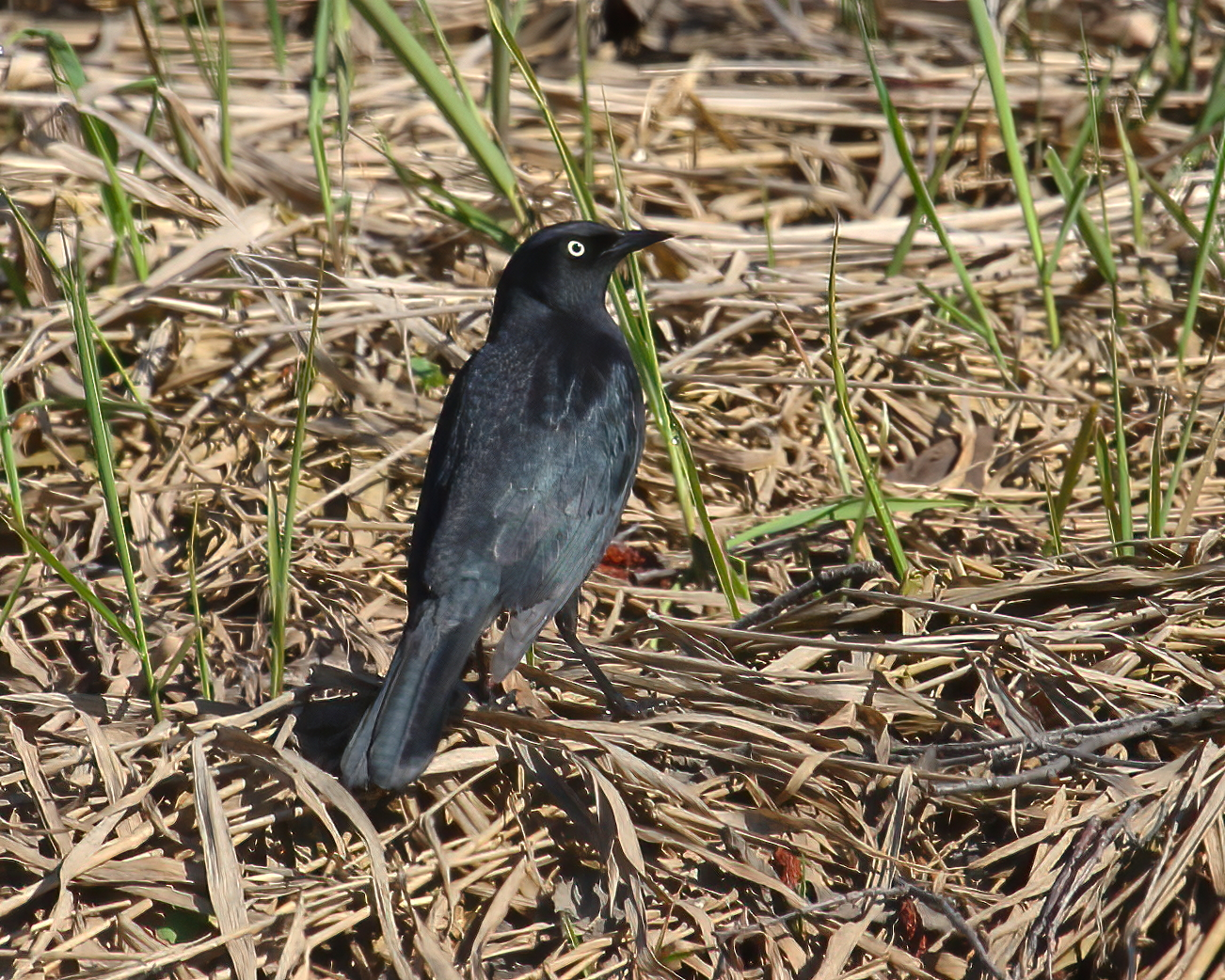
Male, alternate plumage.

== Habitat ==
Their breeding habitat is wet temperate coniferous forests and muskeg across Canada, New England, the Upper Peninsula of Michigan, the Adirondack Mountains in New York and Alaska. Birds usually nest at the edge of ponds and wetlands with the cup nest located in a tree or dense shrub, often over the water. Emerging dragonflies and their larvae are important food items during the summer.

These birds migrate to the eastern and southeastern United States, into parts of the Grain Belt, sometimes straying into Mexico. Additional vagrants have been reported inn Greenland and Russian Siberia.

== Behavior ==
Rusty blackbirds forage on wet ground or in shallow water, mainly eating insects, crustaceans, small fish during the breeding season. In winter, their diet is more flexible, and contains grains (e.g., corn and rice) and other seeds. In fragmented landscapes, overwintering populations may also rely on the mast of seed-producing trees, such as pecans and oaks. They very rarely will attack small passerine birds in periods of extreme food shortage.

They feed in flocks during migration and on the wintering grounds, both in conspecific and mixed-flocks alongside red-winged blackbirds, common grackles, and European starlings. They more often roost with other blackbirds; some small roosts are in brushy vegetation in old fields and others are in massive mixed flocks—sometimes in the urban areas.

The species nests relatively early for a boreal forest bird. They linger in the boreal zone to complete their molt. Their autumn migration is slow, with birds often remaining in the northern states well into December; spring migration is much more rapid. The largest wintering concentrations are found in the lower Mississippi Valley, with smaller concentrations in the Piedmont and south Atlantic coastal plain.

Fairly quiet in fall migration and most of the winter, both males and females will sing (particularly on warm days) in the late winter and spring. The song consists of gurgling and high-pitched squeaks.

== Population ==
Rusty blackbirds have declined significantly in recent decades. The reasons are unclear, but habitat loss is likely a major contributor to the decline. The habitat loss is likely due to multiple factors, including development for oil, gas, and mining industries, hydroelectric projects, and the clearing of forests for forestry. Mercury contamination may be a problem for populations in northeastern North America. Rarer than previously believed, it was uplisted from a species of Least Concern to Vulnerable status on the 2007 IUCN Red List. Deliberate poisoning of mixed-species blackbird flocks, targeting brown-headed cowbird, common grackle and red-winged blackbird, in the southeastern U.S. may also be playing a role; there is currently no estimate of the number of rusty blackbirds killed by these poisonings. In the eastern part of its range, acid rain may be decreasing the availability of calcium-rich invertebrates that the rusty blackbird depends on for food.

Additionally, citizen science projects such as the North American Breeding Bird Survey and Christmas Bird Count have determined that rusty blackbirds have dropped 85%–98% in the past 40 years. Scientists are urgently trying to understand the causes of this severe population decline. Sighting submission services such as eBird are encouraging birders to keep track of rusty blackbirds. The International Rusty Blackbird Working Group has been actively coordinating and conducting research on this species since 2005.
