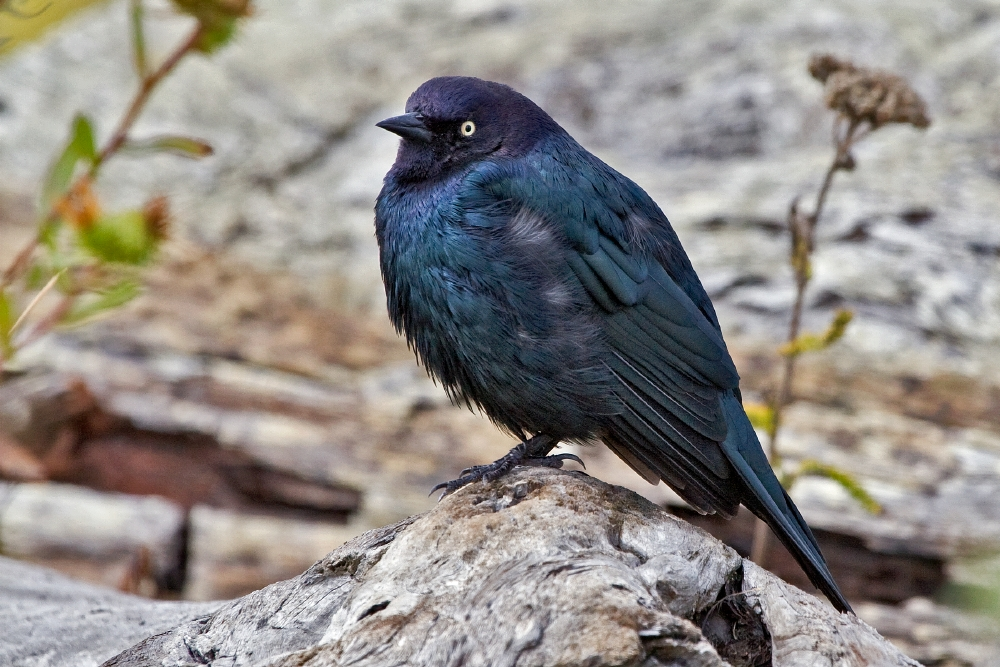
- Male in Esquimalt Lagoon Migratory Bird Sanctuary, British Columbia
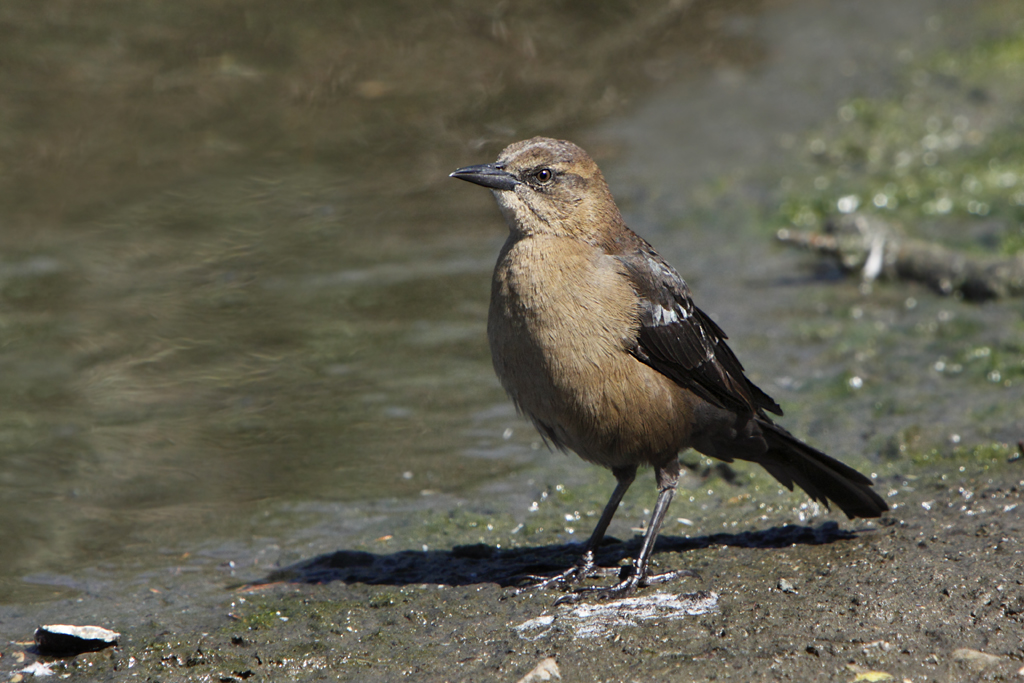
- Female in San Luis Obispo, California

Conservation status
- Near Threatened (IUCN 3.1)

Scientific classification
- Kingdom: Animalia
- Phylum: Chordata
- Class: Aves
- Order: Passeriformes
- Family: Icteridae
- Genus: Euphagus
- Species: E. cyanocephalus

Binomial name
- Euphagus cyanocephalus (Wagler, 1829)
- Range of E. cyanocephalus Breeding range Year-round range Migration range Wintering range

Synonyms
- Euphagus affinis (Shufeldt, 1892)

= Brewer's blackbird =

Species of bird

Female Brewer's blackbird calls

Brewer's blackbird (Euphagus cyanocephalus) is a medium-sized New World blackbird. It is named after the ornithologist Thomas Mayo Brewer.

== Description ==
Adult males have black plumage with an iridescent purple head and neck and glossy bluish-green highlights on the rest of the body. The feet and legs are black and the eye is bright yellow. The female is brownish-grey with slight hints of the male's iridescence. The female's eyes are dark brown, while the male's is bright yellow. Overall, they resemble the eastern member of the same genus, the rusty blackbird; Brewer's blackbird, however, has a shorter bill and the male's head is iridescent purple. This bird is often mistaken for the common grackle but has a shorter tail. The call is a sharp check which is also distinguishable. This bird is in a different family from the Eurasian blackbird.

Standard Measurements
length	8–10.3 in (200–260 mm)
weight	63 g (2.2 oz)
wingspan	15.5 in (390 mm)
wing	121–133 mm (4.8–5.2 in)
tail	95–102.5 mm (3.74–4.04 in)
culmen	20.4–24 mm (0.80–0.94 in)
tarsus	29.5–33.5 mm (1.16–1.32 in)

== Habitat ==
Their breeding habitat is open and semi-open areas, often near water, across central and western North America. They are also very common in parking lots or around schools, and easily acclimate to the presence of people. They can live in low elevation, as low as below sea level in Southern California, and elevations as high as 8,000 feet. They are capable of surviving in diverse environments, including marshlands and forests.

These birds are often permanent residents in the west. Other birds migrate to the Southeastern United States and Mexico in Spring. The range of this bird has been expanding east in the Great Lakes region. They have expanded their habitat as recently as the 20th century.

== Behavior ==
When Brewer's blackbirds identify threats, such as hawks or even humans, they dive towards them and emit an alarm call. Sometimes, when particularly threatened, they will use physical force on predators.

Brewer's blackbirds often walk along the ground. They can be seen making jerking motions with their heads. In colder months, these birds tend to flock together and forage. Sometimes, other species of blackbirds will join these flocks. During nesting season, their foraging behavior becomes more independent. Brewer's blackbirds have been seen cleverly following vehicles plowing fields, eating the churned up insects.

== Feeding ==
They forage in shallow water or in fields, mainly eating seeds and insects, some berries. They sometimes catch insects in flight. They feed in flocks outside of the breeding season, sometimes with other blackbirds. In marshy areas, they are known to stand on aquatic plants and wade in shallow water to catch insects. Some have even been known to eat smaller mammals, amphibians, and the nestlings of other birds.

== Reproduction ==
These birds have mates but the mates do not stay together all year round. The same pair tends to reunite for mating season and both parents take a role in feeding. During mating, male Brewer's blackbirds will puff up their feathers while simultaneously spreading out their wings and tail to look as large as possible. They will point their beak out forward. Their clutch size can vary, usually between 3–7. Eggs are usually a tan color with darker speckles throughout to allow for camouflage. The female bird primarily incubates for 12–14 days. The chicks leave the nest only 2 weeks after hatching.

Nests are not built in isolation, but in colonies of up to 30 pairs. Pairs prefer to nest in areas that are around 20–40' in treetops. However, colonies that live near water may also nest in reeds and other freshwater plants. Nests are made from nearby material such as reeds, sticks and hair. They are built by the female in a cup-like shape and are bonded with mud or other securing substances. The color of the nest usually matches the coloration of the eggs and the surrounding environment as it is crucial to survival. Brewer's blackbird chicks do not immediately open their eyes upon hatching and do not hatch with feathers.

== Protected status ==
Brewer's blackbird (Euphagus cyanocephalus) is protected in the United States under the Migratory Bird Treaty Act of 1918, however exceptions are granted under 50 CFR part 21 (2014) for animals committing or about to commit depredations upon ornamental or shade trees, agricultural crops, livestock, or wildlife, or when concentrated in such numbers and manner that they are a health hazard or other nuisance. They are moderately threatened by climate change. However, this could change if temperatures continue to rise. If temperatures rise by 3 degrees celsius, they could lose 30% of their range. Heat and wildfires are particularly threatening. Their numbers have dropped 57% from 1966 to 2019. It is estimated that there are currently 23 million Brewer's blackbirds in the wild.

== Gallery ==
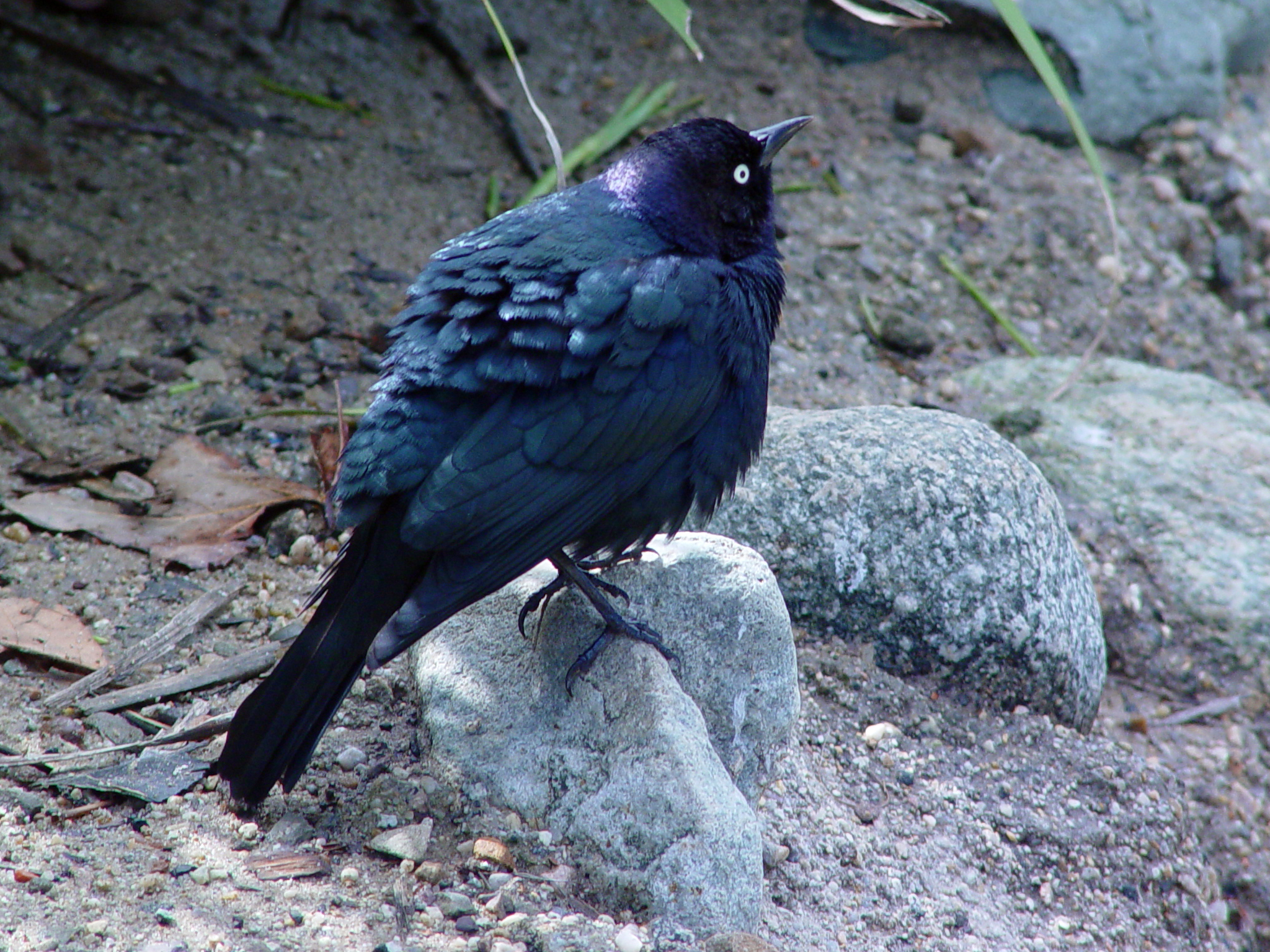
E. cyanocephalus male

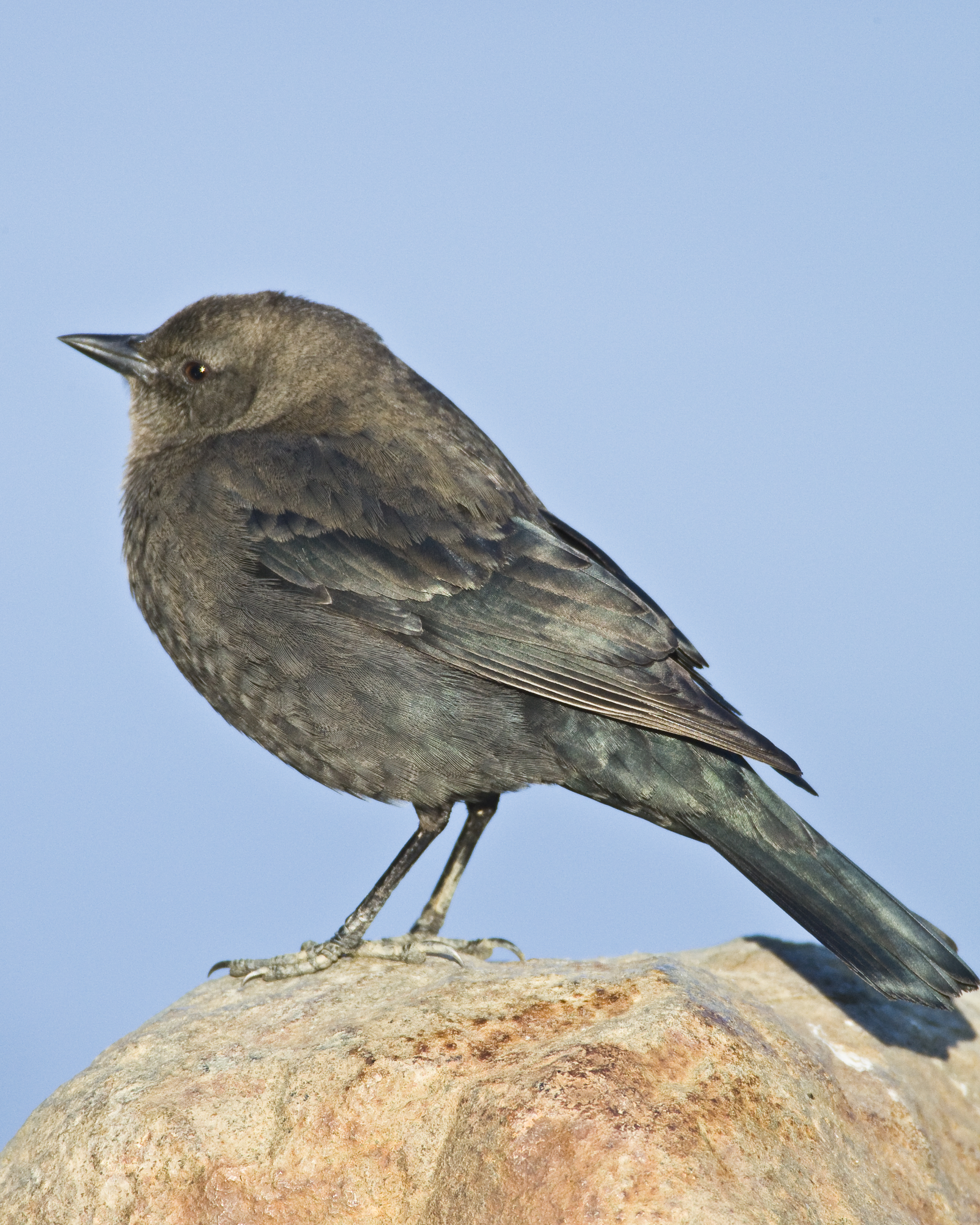
E. cyanocephalus female

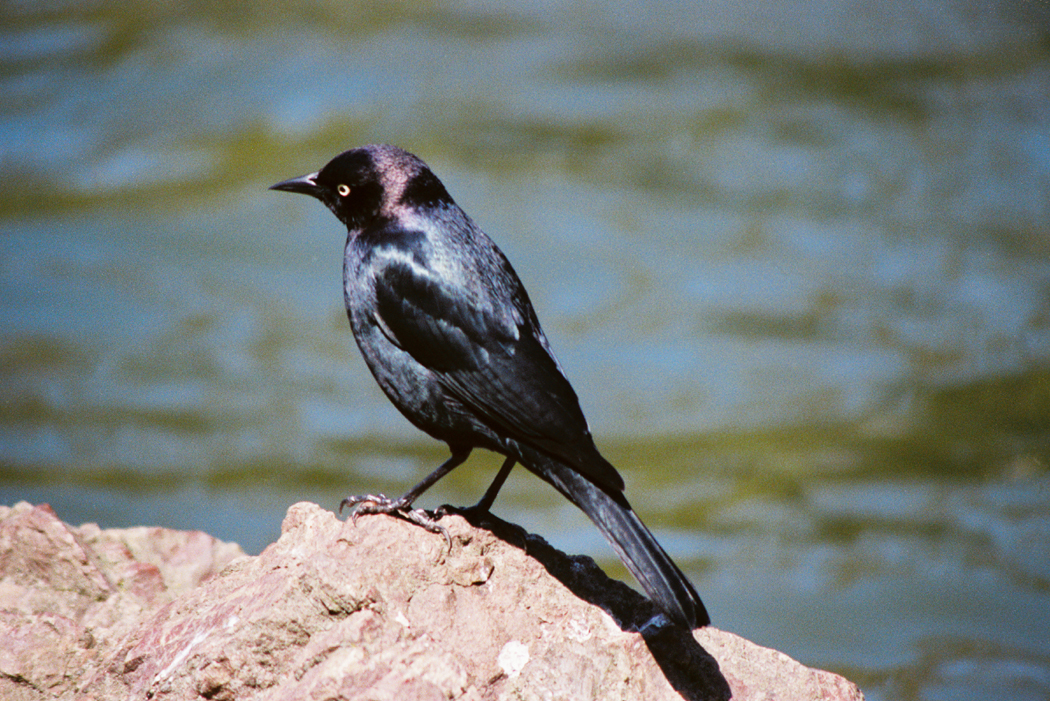
The iridescent purple head of the male is a distinguishing feature.

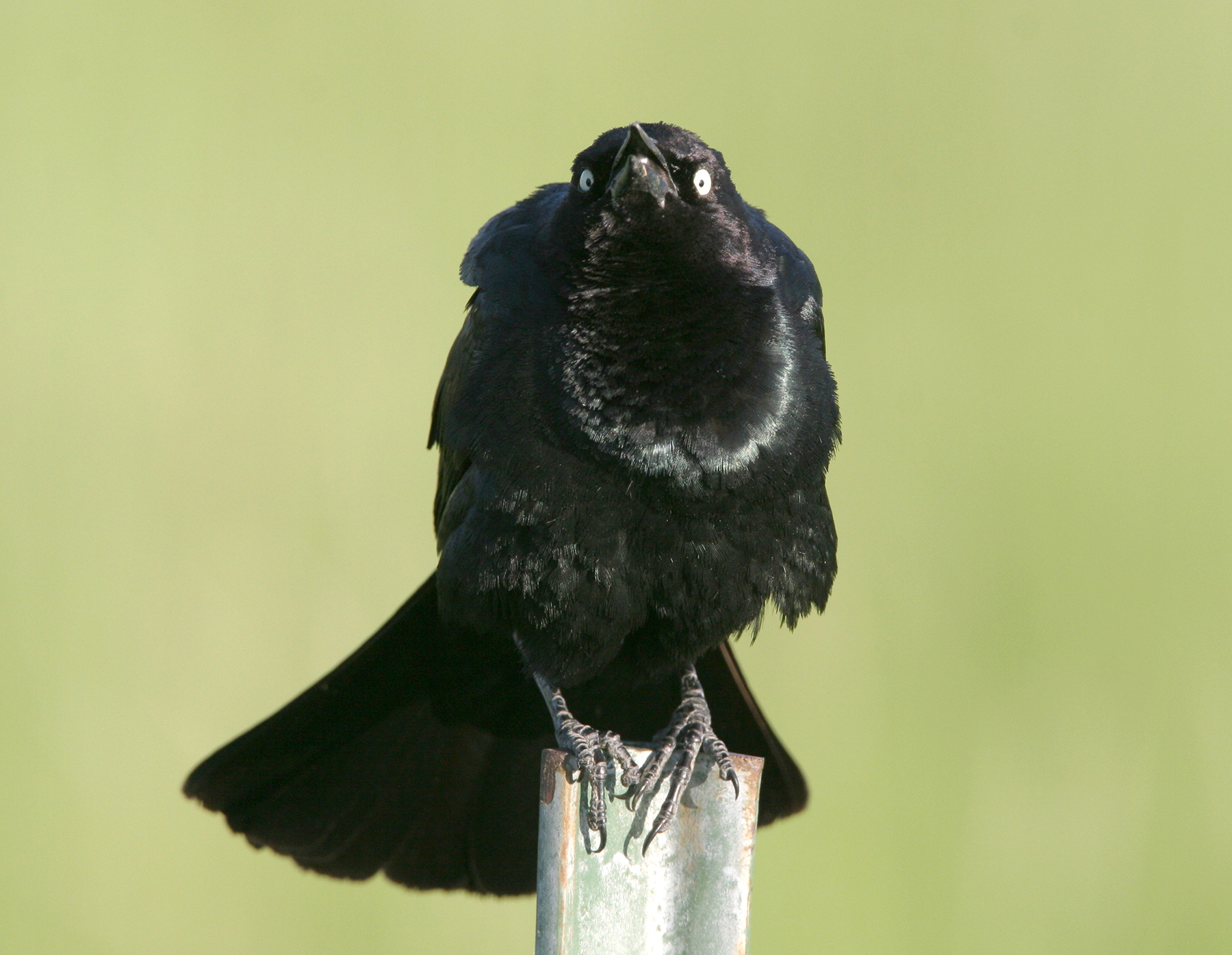
Male, Nevada, US

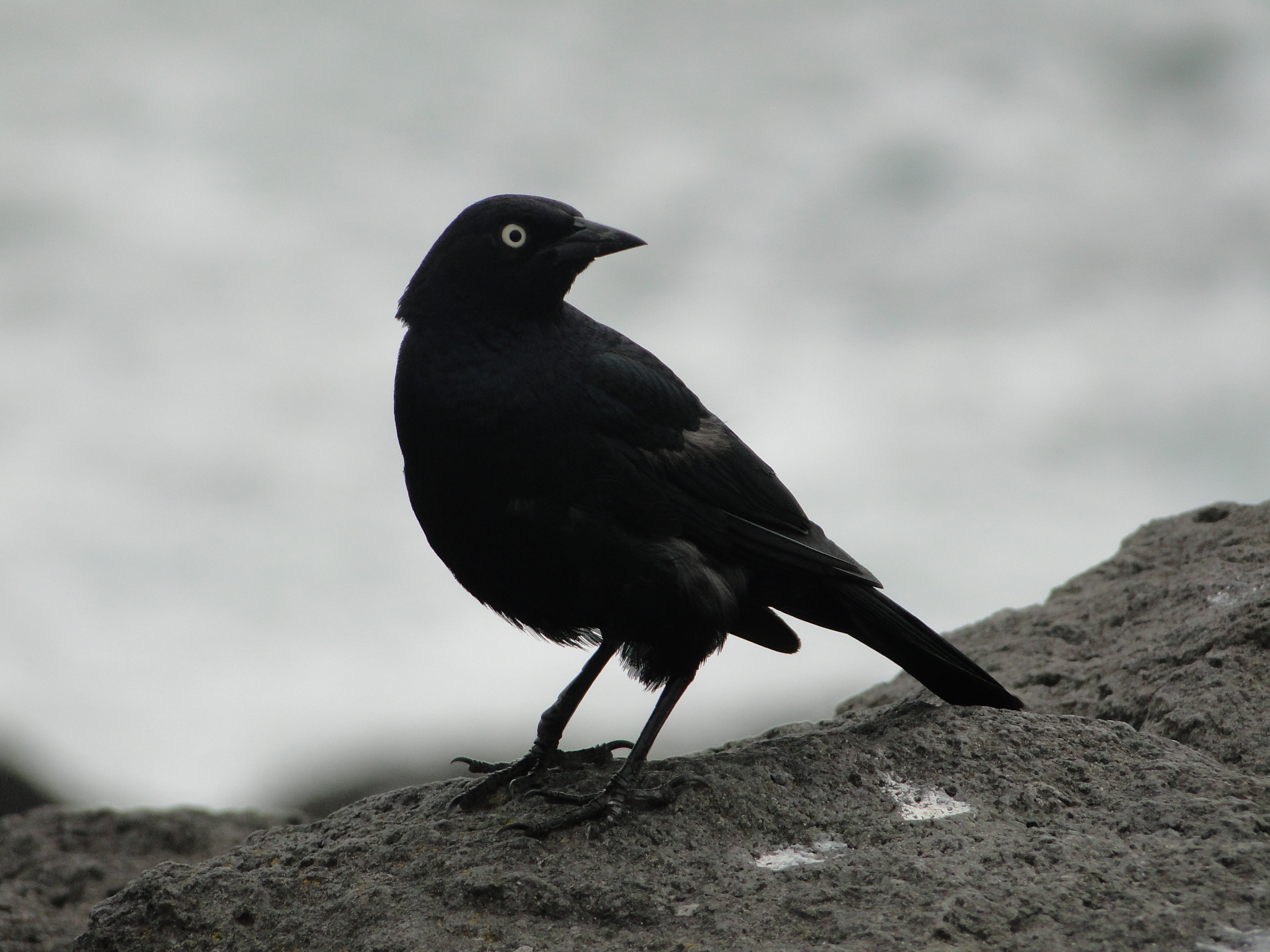
Male, Oregon, US

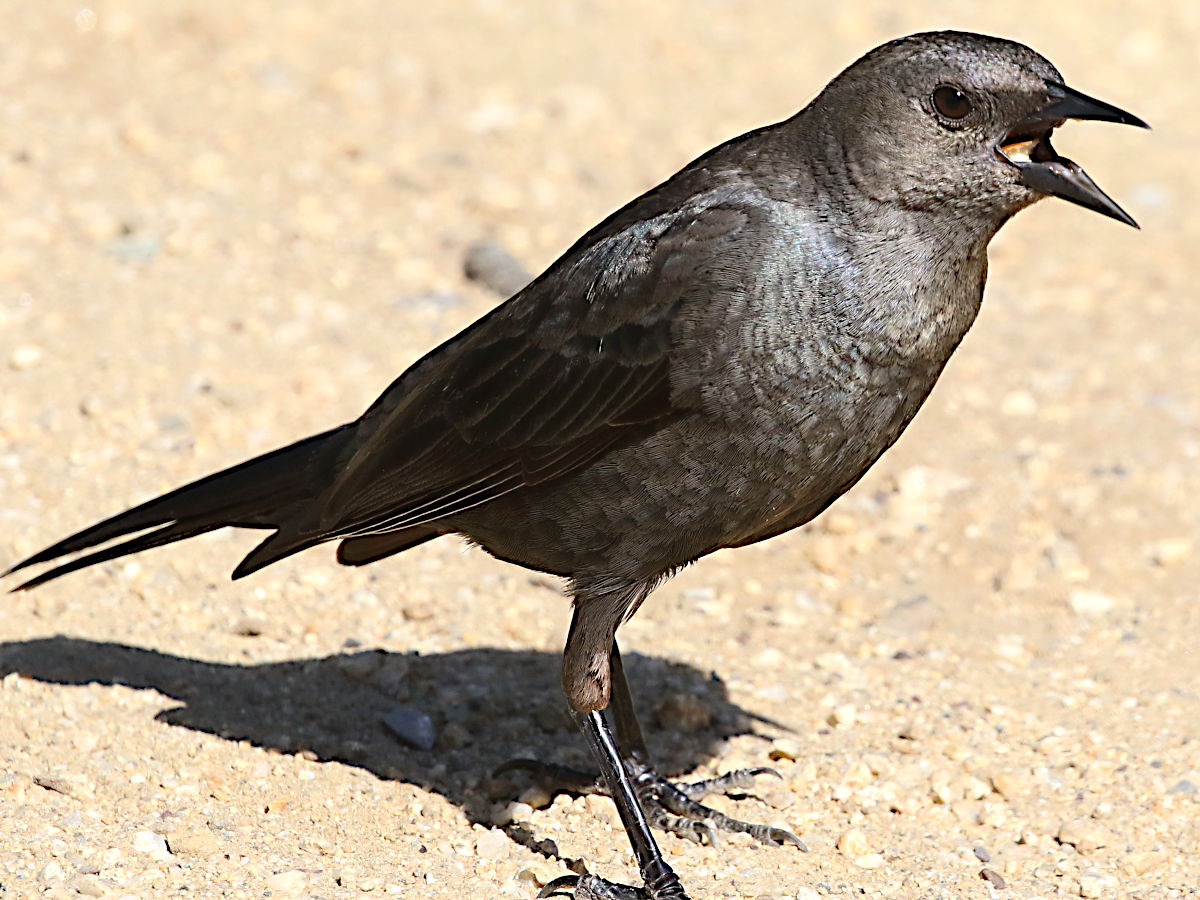
Female calling

Brewer's blackbird calling
