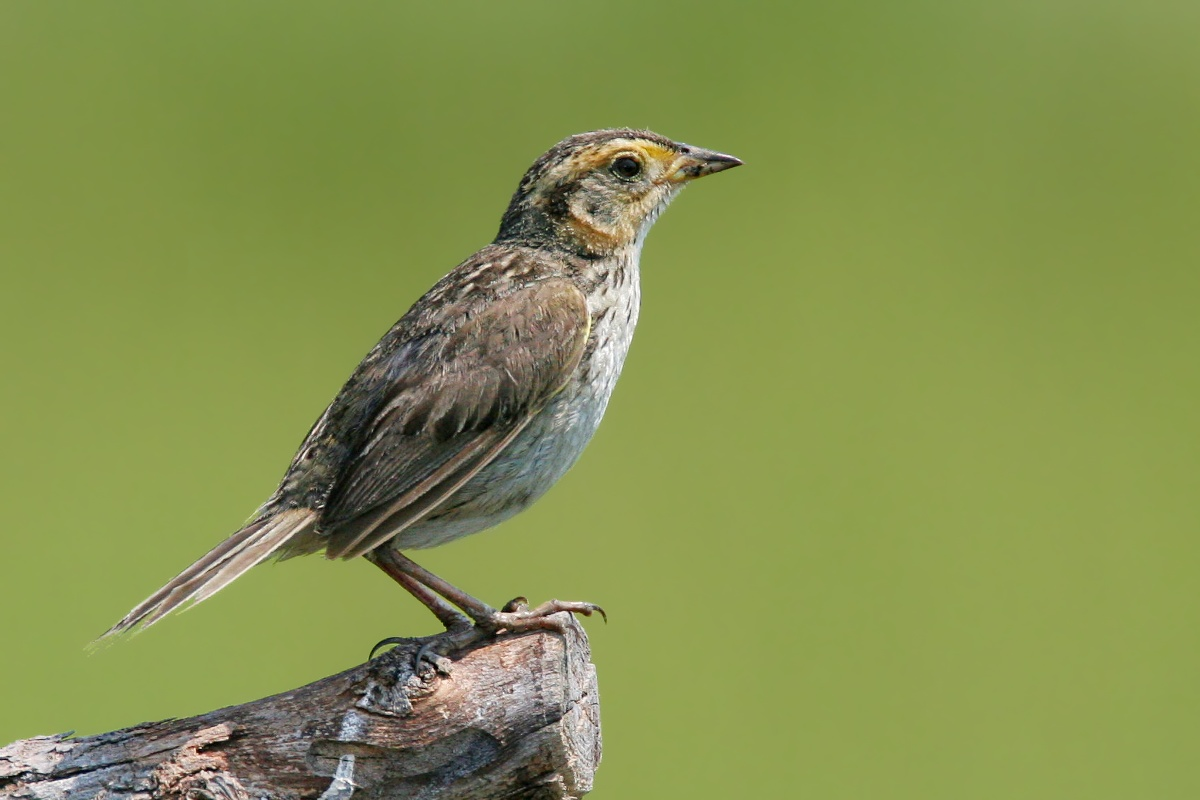
- Saltmarsh sparrow (A. caudacuta)

Scientific classification
- Kingdom: Animalia
- Phylum: Chordata
- Class: Aves
- Order: Passeriformes
- Family: Passerellidae
- Genus: Ammospiza; Oberholser, 1905

Type species
- Oriolus caudacutus Gmelin, JF, 1788

Species
- See text

= Ammospiza =

Genus of birds

Ammospiza is a genus of birds in the family Passerellidae, in the group known as American sparrows.

The genus name combines the Ancient Greek άμμος (ámmos) meaning "sand" and σπίζα (spíza) meaning "finch".

== Species ==
The genus contains the following four species:

Genus Ammospiza – Oberholser, 1905 – four species
Common name	Scientific name and subspecies	Range	Size and ecology	IUCN status and estimated population
Seaside sparrow	Ammospiza maritima (Wilson, 1811) Eight subspecies: A. m. fisheri (Chapman, 1899); A. m. macgillivraii (Audubon, 1834); A. m. maritima (A. Wilson, 1811): nominate subspecies; A. m. mirabilis (A. H. Howell, 1919): Cape Sable seaside sparrow; endemic to southern Florida, where it is endangered; †A. m. nigrescens (Ridgway, 1874): †dusky seaside sparrow; Merritt Island and the St. Johns River, Florida; extinct (last known individual died in 1987); A. m. pelonota (Oberholser, 1931); A. m. peninsulae (J. A. Allen, 1888): Scott's seaside sparrow; Gulf coast of northwestern Florida, from Pasco County to Apalachee Bay; A. m. sennetti (J. A. Allen, 1888)	Atlantic and Gulf coasts of the United States, from southern New Hampshire to southern Texas; northern birds most often migrate farther south along the eastern coast	Size: Habitat: Salt marshes; nests in an open cup, usually on tidal reeds and spartina grasses Diet: Forages on the ground or in marsh vegetation, sometimes probing in mud; mainly insects, marine invertebrates and seeds; feeding areas are often some distance from nesting areas	LC
Nelson's sparrow	Ammospiza nelsoni (J. A. Allen, 1875)	Breeds on the Atlantic coast of Canada and Maine, in central Canada (the Canadian Prairies and a coastal strip south of Hudson Bay) and the north-central United States; winters on the southeastern coast of the United States	Size: 11–13 cm (4.3–5.1 in); 17–21 g (0.6–0.7 oz); wingspan 16.5–20 cm (6.5–7.9 in) Habitat: Marshes; nests in an open cup attached to vegetation close to the ground Diet: Forages on the ground or in marsh vegetation, sometimes probing in mud; mainly insects, aquatic invertebrates and seeds	LC
Saltmarsh sparrow	Ammospiza caudacuta (Gmelin, JF, 1788) Two subspecies: A. c. caudacuta (Gmelin, JF, 1788): breeding northeast USA; A. c. diversa (Bishop, 1901): breeding east USA	Tidal salt marshes along the Atlantic coast of the United States; breeds from Maine to the Chesapeake Bay and winters from North Carolina to Florida	Size: 11–14 cm (4.3–5.5 in); 14–23.1 g (0.49–0.81 oz); wingspan 17.8–21 cm (7.0–8.3 in) Habitat: High marsh dominated by saltmeadow cordgrass and saltmarsh rush; nests in an open cup of grass 6–15 cm (2.4–5.9 in) above the ground Diet: Forages on the ground along tidal channels or in marsh vegetation, sometimes probing in mud at low tide; nestlings fed mainly flies, amphipods, grasshoppers and moths (especially soldier flies); adults eat seeds in winter	EN Decreasing; over 75% decline since the 1990s; about 53,000 individuals in 2016
LeConte's sparrow	Ammospiza leconteii (Audubon, 1844)	Breeds in northeastern British Columbia, Alberta, Saskatchewan, southern Manitoba, central Ontario and Quebec, south to northern Michigan, Montana and Minnesota; winters in the southeastern United States, west to central Texas and north to central Illinois and Missouri	Size: 12 cm (4.7 in); 12–16 g (0.4–0.6 oz); wingspan 18 cm (7.1 in) Habitat: Moist open grassy areas with sufficient vegetation cover: meadows, fields, crop stubble, shallow marshy edges and prairie, occasionally fens and lake-shores within the boreal forest Diet: Mostly insects in summer (weevils, leafhoppers, leaf beetles, stinkbugs, caterpillars, moths, spiders); seeds of grasses and weeds in winter; secretive, spending most of its time on the ground under cover of tall grasses	LC
