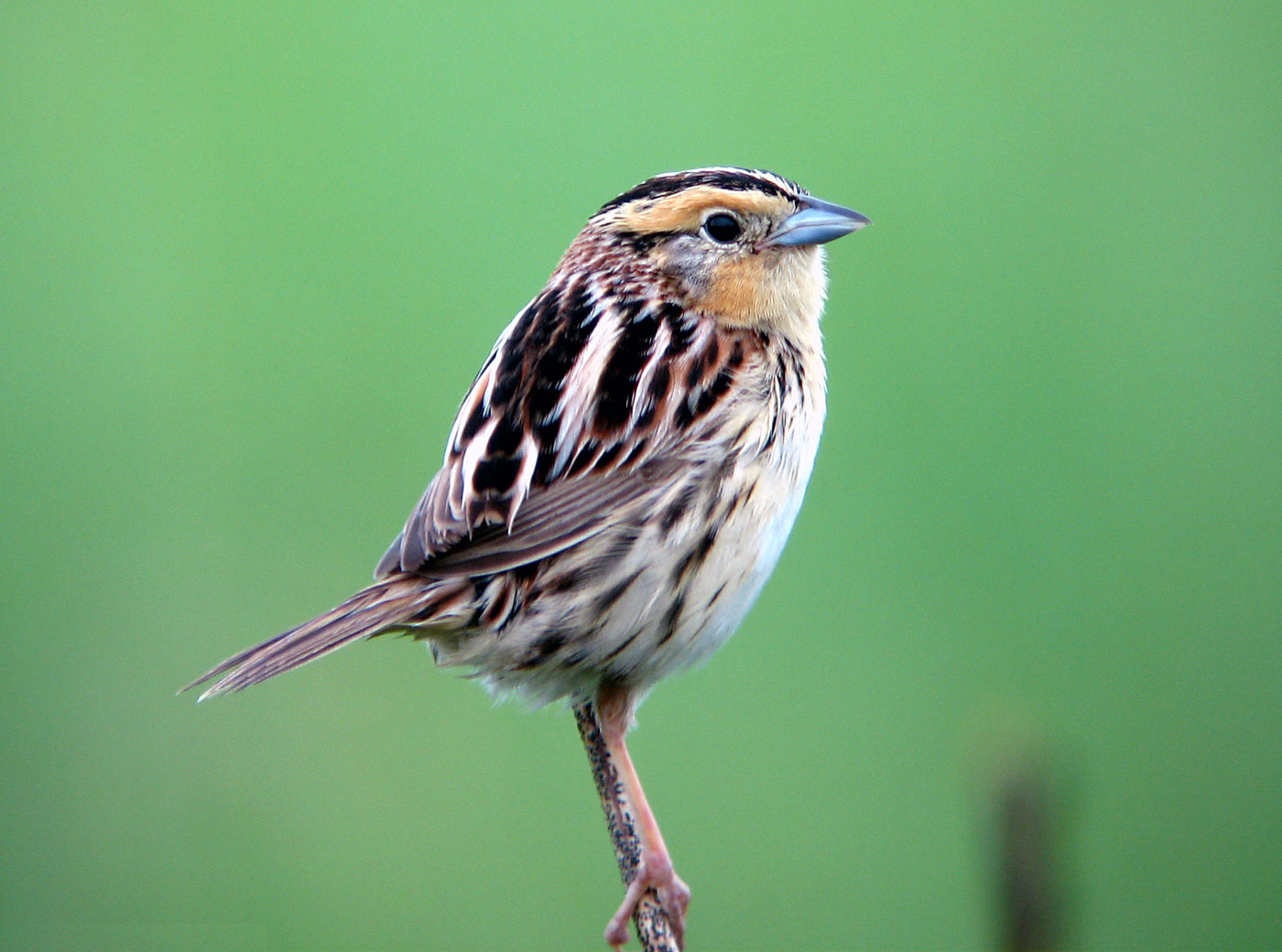

Conservation status
- Least Concern (IUCN 3.1)

Scientific classification
- Kingdom: Animalia
- Phylum: Chordata
- Class: Aves
- Order: Passeriformes
- Family: Passerellidae
- Genus: Ammospiza
- Species: A. leconteii

Binomial name
- Ammospiza leconteii (Audubon, 1844)

= LeConte's sparrow =

Species of bird

LeConte's sparrow (Ammospiza leconteii), also known as LeConte's bunting, is one of the smallest New World sparrow species in North America.

== Description ==
LeConte's sparrow is a small sparrow with a relatively large head, short grey bill and short pointed tail. It has a buffy yellow-orange face with grey cheeks, and a dark brown crown with a white central stripe. The nape of the neck is lilac grey with chestnut streaks, and the back is streaked with brown and beige. Its belly is off white, while the breast and sides are a buffy orange-yellow with dark brown streaks. The feet and legs are a brownish-pink colour.

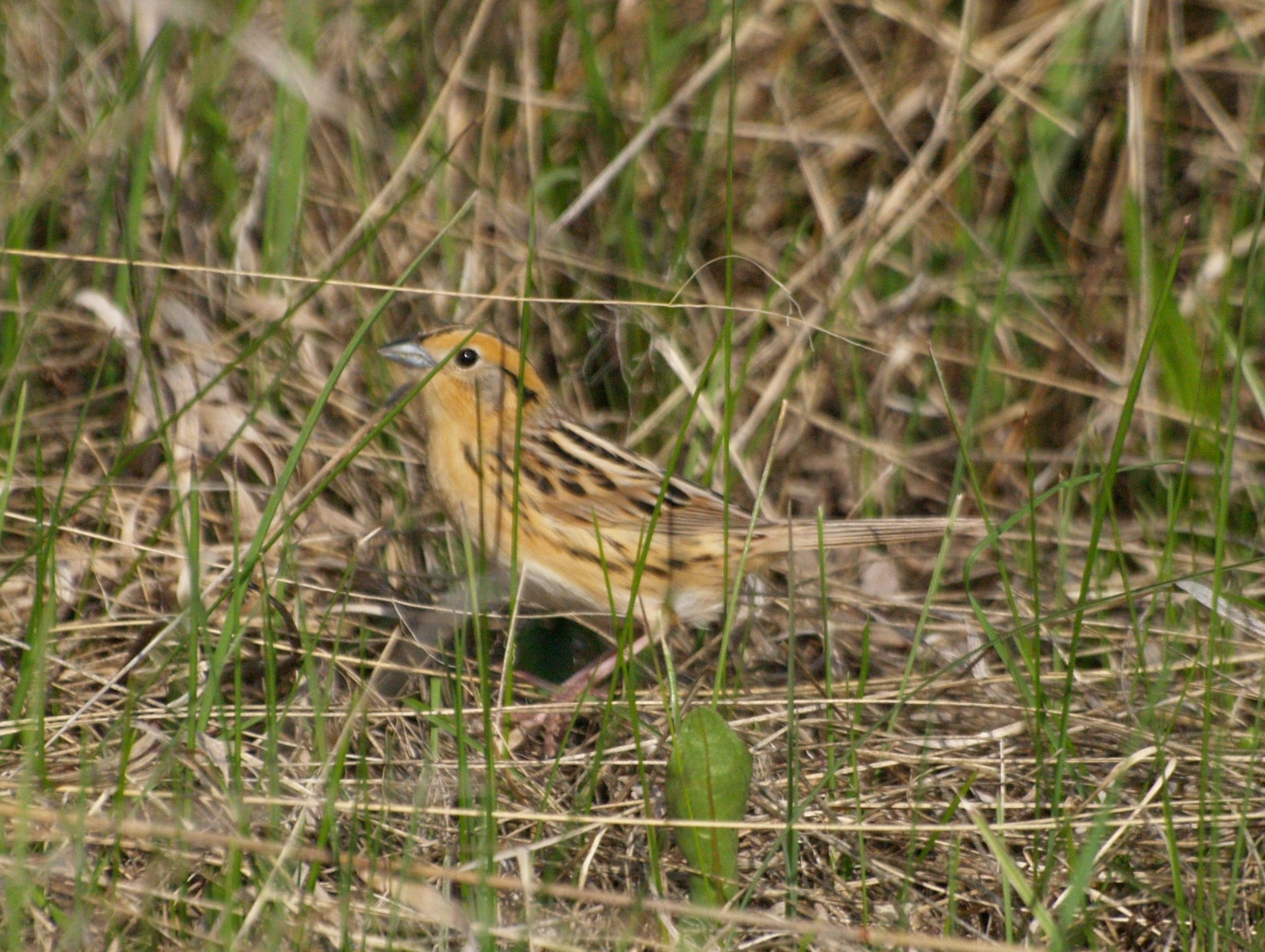
LeConte's sparrow hiding under the cover of grass

=== Measurements ===
The measurements for both sexes are:

- Length: 4.7 in/ 12 cm
- Wingspan: 7.1 in/18 cm
- Weight: 0.4–0.6 oz/ 12–16 g

=== Similar birds ===
LeConte's sparrow is commonly mistaken for other small sparrows, such as the Nelson's sparrow (Ammospiza nelsoni), grasshopper sparrow (Ammodramus savannarum), Henslow's sparrow (Centronyx henslowii), saltmarsh sparrow (Ammospiza caudacuta), and Baird's sparrow. (C. bairdii).

== Taxonomy ==
LeConte's sparrow is a member of the order Passerifomes, which are the perching birds, sometimes less accurately referred to as the songbirds. It is from the family Passerellidae, which is characterized by species of small birds with bills adapted to seed eating. LeConte's sparrow was placed in the genus Ammodramus in the past and a molecular phylogeny of the related groups identified that genus as being polyphyletic and recommended the group to be split up. This species falls within the genus Ammospiza clade which includes A. maritimus, A. nelsoni, and A. caudacutus, which are the ground-loving sparrows that prefer staying in tall, thick grasses to perching on trees. There has been a recorded case of a LeConte's sparrow that hybridized with a Nelson's sparrow, in June 1949 in Ontario, Canada.

LeConte's sparrow was first described by John Latham in 1790 but only received a valid binomial name from John James Audubon in 1844. He wrote, "I have named this interesting species after my young friend Doctor Le Conte, son of Major Le Conte, so well known among naturalists, and who is, like his father, much attached to the study of natural history." It is generally believed that he meant John Lawrence LeConte (whose father had been an Army surveyor with the rank of major), although some feel that he was referring to another John LeConte, also a doctor, and John Lawrence's cousin.

== Habitat and distribution ==
=== Range ===
LeConte's sparrow breeds in select areas of Canada, such as northeastern British Columbia, across Alberta, Saskatchewan and southern Manitoba as well as central Ontario and into Quebec; and as far south as northern Michigan, Montana and Minnesota. It winters in the southeastern United States; as far west as central Texas and as far north as central Illinois and Missouri.

=== Habitat ===
LeConte's sparrow prefers moist open grassy areas with sufficient vegetation cover to provide shelter. Known habitat use includes meadows, fields, crop stubble, shallow marshy edges, prairie, and occasionally fens and lake-shores within the boreal forest. Studies have shown that vegetation seems to have a greater impact on the abundance of this bird than other factors like climate or patch size. Winter et al. (2005) says that it can be found at highest densities in areas with a "moderate amounts of bare ground". Agriculture and drainage of these areas is currently the greatest threat to LeConte's sparrow.

== Behaviour ==
It is a very secretive bird that prefers to spend most of its time on the ground under the cover of tall grasses. They are typically very difficult to flush, often only flushing at a distance of 1–3 m (3–10 ft) as they prefer to run across the ground. When they do emerge they rarely fly more than a foot or two above the grass and often descend again within a few meters. Because it is so rarely seen, there are still many gaps in knowledge about LeConte's sparrow. Nests are often very hard to find, and individuals are more often identified by sound than by sight. For example, one survey of LeConte's sparrows identified 86 males by sound, but only 8 of those males by sight. For the same reason, very few LeConte's have ever been banded. Between 1967 and 1984, only 355 were actually banded, and none were ever re-captured.

=== Vocalizations ===
The male's song resembles a grasshopper buzz with a short squeaky introductory note and ending with a short chirp. It is often described as tika-zzzzzzzzzzzz-tik while the call is a short tsip. It is most commonly confused with the song of the Nelson's sparrow. The male generally sings from a concealed location, but can also be seen singing from the top of protruding grass stems, or occasionally in flight.

=== Diet ===
Their diet in the summer is mostly insects such as weevils, leafhoppers, leaf beetles, stinkbugs, caterpillars, moths and spiders. During the winter time the main diet consists of seeds of grasses and weeds such as northern dropseed, Indian grass, yellow foxtail, panic-grass, scorpion-grass, little bluestem, and big bluestem.

=== Reproduction ===
Mating can start as early as late April but peaks in mid-May. Males will sing from the cover of dense grasses, perched on tall grass or in flight. Clutches range from two to six eggs with four being the most common. Incubation is done solely by the female, though both parents aid in feeding. Incubation lasts an average of 11–13 days. Hatchlings are altricial with dull brown downy patches. Pairs will have one or two broods per year. Due to the secretive nature of this bird little is known about the period of time between hatching and fledging.

==== Nest ====
Nests are built by the female and are cup shaped, made from fine grasses and lined with soft grass and hair. They are usually attached to standing grasses or sedges and are built on or close to the ground. Their nests are often parasitized by brown-headed cowbirds (Molothrus ater).

==== Eggs ====
Eggs are 18 X 14 mm long and are sub elliptical in shape. Eggs are white with undertones of green, grey or blue; covered in fine brown dots, speckles or splotches usually clustered near large end of egg.
