= Scott's seaside sparrow =

Conservation status
- Vulnerable (NatureServe)

Scientific classification
- Kingdom: Animalia
- Phylum: Chordata
- Class: Aves
- Order: Passeriformes
- Family: Passerellidae
- Genus: Ammospiza
- Species: A. maritima
- Subspecies: A. m. peninsulae

Trinomial name
- Ammospiza maritima peninsulae J. A. Allen, 1888

Subspecies of bird

Scott's seaside sparrow (Ammospiza maritima peninsulae) is a subspecies of the seaside sparrow. It was originally thought to be a separate species but later reconsidered as a subspecies of the seaside sparrow.

== Distribution ==
It can be found along the Gulf of Mexico coast of northwestern Florida, where it breeds from Pasco County to Apalachee Bay and in the swamplands of St. George and St. Vincent islands. The exact limits of the population are not well known.

== Taxonomy ==
This subspecies is a close relative of the extinct dusky seaside sparrow subspecies (A. m. nigrescens); it was used to crossbreed with the few remaining dusky seaside sparrows.
