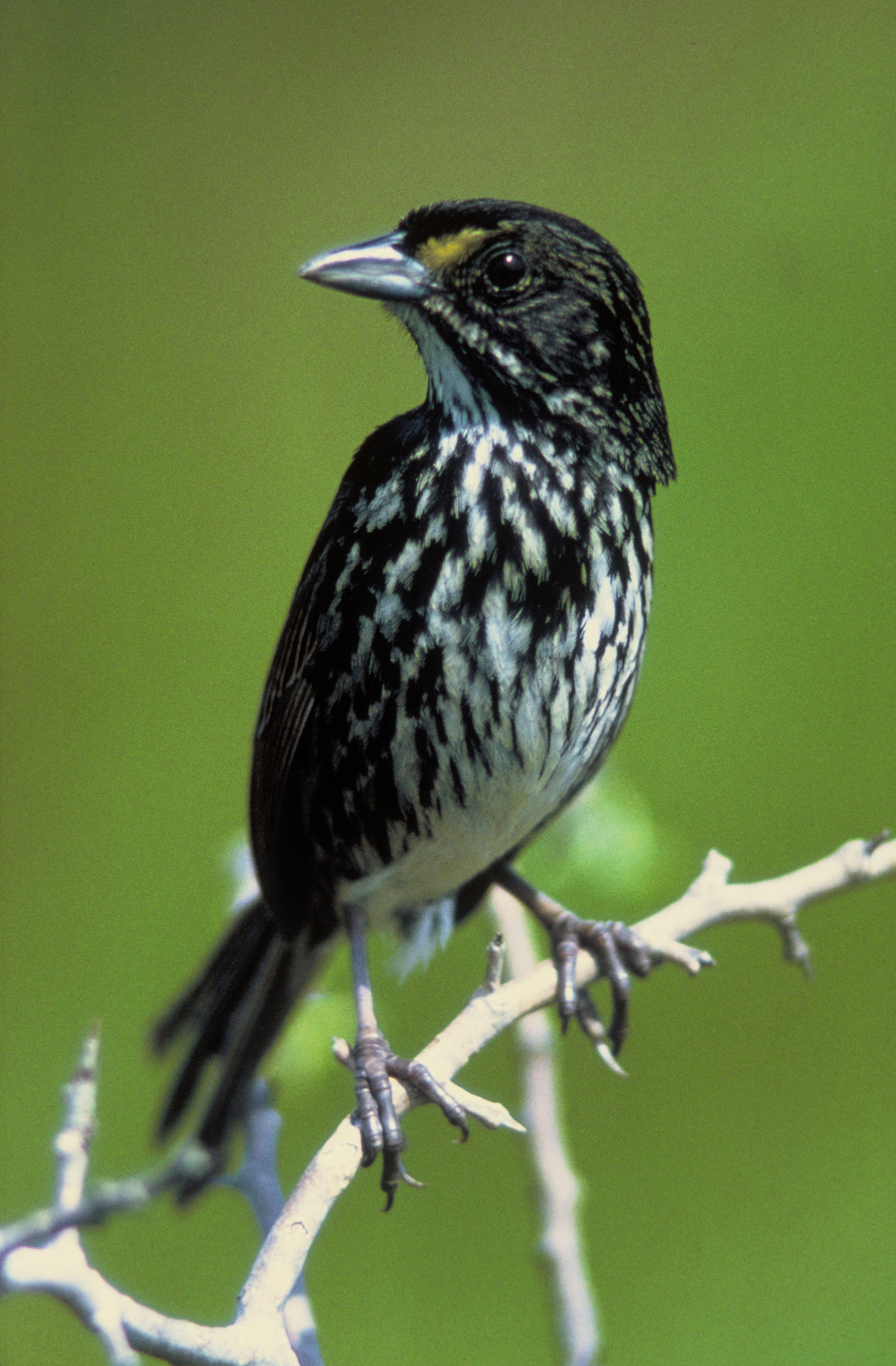

Conservation status
- Presumed Extinct (NatureServe)

- Extinct (ESA)

Scientific classification
- Kingdom: Animalia
- Phylum: Chordata
- Class: Aves
- Order: Passeriformes
- Family: Passerellidae
- Genus: Ammospiza
- Species: A. maritima
- Subspecies: †A. m. nigrescens

Trinomial name
- †Ammospiza maritima nigrescens (Ridgway, 1873)

= Dusky seaside sparrow =

Extinct subspecies of bird

The dusky seaside sparrow (Ammospiza maritima nigrescens) is an extinct non-migratory subspecies of the seaside sparrow, found in Florida in the natural salt marshes of Merritt Island and along the St. Johns River. The last definite known individual died on Walt Disney World's Discovery Island in 1987, and the subspecies was officially declared extinct in December 1990.

== Origin ==
The dusky seaside sparrow was first categorized as a species in 1873, after its discovery on March 17, 1872, by Charles Johnson Maynard. Its dark coloration and distinct song, which is introduced by a buzz rather than the discrete clicks heard in Ammospiza maritima mirabilis and has been described as "insect-like" by ornithologist William Post, distinguish it as a subspecies from other seaside sparrows. Found in the marshes of Florida's Atlantic Coast on Merritt Island and the upper St. Johns River, the dusky seaside sparrow was geographically isolated from other seaside sparrows. It was categorized as a subspecies in 1873. Even though the dusky's mitochondrial DNA is the same as the mitochondrial DNA of other seaside sparrow populations, DNA testing by itself does not demonstrate that its subspecies classification is undeserving. In 1981, only five dusky seaside sparrows remained, all being males. Conservation efforts were made by trying to breed the remaining duskies with Scott's seaside sparrows in order to create half dusky hybrid offspring. "Unfortunately, although the Fish and Wildlife Service initially supported the crossbreeding program, it withdrew its support due to Interior's hybrid policy". Due to only the males being left, even though duskies could be crossbred with other seaside sparrows, there would never be another pure dusky seaside sparrow again.

== Species divergence ==
Based on comparisons between mtDNA of the dusky seaside sparrow and its close relative, Scott's seaside sparrow, John Avise and William Nelson were able to estimate the last time that the dusky seaside sparrow and Scott's seaside sparrow came in contact. Since it has been established that the dusky seaside sparrow had a very small inhabited locale, it was isolated from other sparrows for a very long time. Assuming that the mtDNA in sparrows evolves at the rate which is estimated for mammals and other birds (approximately 2–4% every million years), then the last time the dusky seaside sparrow was in contact with Scott's seaside sparrow was approximately 250,000–500,000 years ago, giving plenty of time for the dusky seaside sparrow to establish differences between other subspecies of the species, such as its unique plumage and call.

== Causes for extinction ==
Dusky seaside sparrow populations probably declined during the 1940s, 1950s and 1960s, temporally linked to the applications of DDT pesticide on Merritt Island to control mosquitoes and, after 1956, to the creation of mosquito impoundments that caused loss of salt marsh. When Merritt Island was flooded with the goal of reducing the mosquito population around the Kennedy Space Center, the sparrows' nesting grounds were devastated, and their numbers plummeted. Later, the marshes surrounding the river were drained to facilitate highway construction along with the sugar and oil industries; this was a further blow. Eventually, pollution and pesticides took such a high toll that by 1979, only six dusky seaside sparrows were known to exist, all of whom were males; a female was last sighted in 1975. These last six birds would be named for the colors of the identification bands on their legs: "Blue Band", "Green Band", "Orange Band", "Red Band", "White Band" and "Yellow Band".

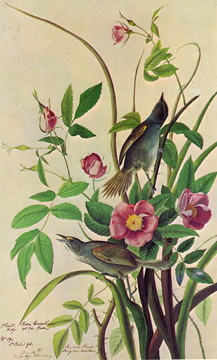
Illustration by John James Audubon

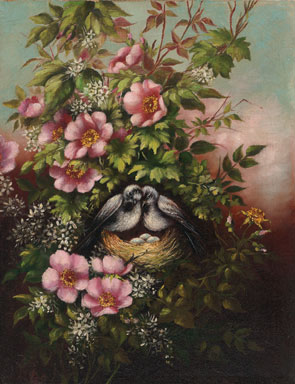
Illustration by Martin Johnson Heade

== Last specimens ==
"Orange Band" was left by himself on the St. Johns Unit of the St. Johns NWR after a yellow-leg-banded dusky was captured in 1979. Field observations of color banded sparrows from 1975 to 1979 indicated that dusky seaside sparrows seldom traveled more than a mile or two in their lifetimes. In April 1980, "Orange Band" was again observed on the St. Johns Unit, but was surprisingly captured in June eight miles south on the Beeline Unit in the company of a dusky with a green leg band. Before finding "Green Band", "Orange Band" passed the general vicinity of the two unbanded dusky seaside sparrows.

With so few individuals left, a last-ditch effort captive breeding program was approved, wherein the remaining dusky seaside sparrows, all males, would be crossbred with females of the closely related Scott's seaside sparrow (A. m. peninsulae), from Florida's gulf coast. By 1980, five of the six duskies sighted in 1979 had been captured and were being housed at the Santa Fe College Teaching Zoo in Gainesville, Florida, as part of this program. "Green Band" proved elusive, and was never recaptured after having been banded. He was last seen on July 23, 1980.

In 1983, the last four living dusky seaside sparrows were moved to the Walt Disney World Resort, to continue crossbreeding and living out their days in a protected habitat on the Discovery Island nature reserve. Sometime before the move, "Red Band" had succumbed to a tumor. Between the remaining four individuals and their mates, a total of just five viable offspring were produced. A single male, who was 75% dusky, and four females, that were 25%, 50%, 75%, and 87.5% dusky, respectively.

By March 31, 1986, further breeding attempts had failed, and of the four dusky seaside sparrows originally brought to Discovery Island, only "Orange Band" remained.

Despite being blind in one eye, "Orange Band" reached an extreme old age for a sparrow, living at least eight years, and possibly as many as thirteen, before being found dead on June 17, 1987. In the hopes that cloning would someday give scientists another chance at saving the subspecies, the heart and liver of "Orange Band" were cryopreserved, and his body was preserved in alcohol at the Florida Museum of Natural History.

After the death of the final "pure" dusky sparrow, the breeding program was discontinued due to the fact that it was thought the hybrids that existed could not reproduce to create dusky sparrows, since they did not share the proper mtDNA that dusky sparrows possess. However, research done on a similar species known as Passerella iliaca, or the fox sparrow, was able to show that some subspecies of one plumage group had the plumage of another despite having the "wrong" mtDNA type. This potentially meant that if the breeding program was continued with the dusky sparrow hybrids, sparrows with the same color plumage as the dusky sparrows would eventually be produced. Unfortunately, shortly after the breeding program was halted, the remaining hybrid sparrows either died or escaped captivity, leading to the final extinction of the taxon.
