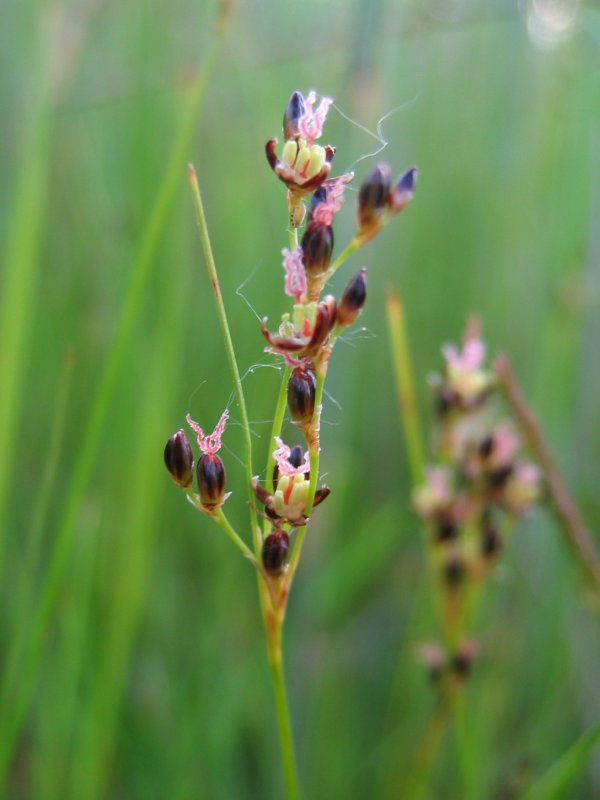

Conservation status
- Least Concern (IUCN 3.1)

Scientific classification
- Kingdom: Plantae
- Clade: Tracheophytes
- Clade: Angiosperms
- Clade: Monocots
- Clade: Commelinids
- Order: Poales
- Family: Juncaceae
- Genus: Juncus
- Species: J. gerardii

Binomial name
- Juncus gerardii Loisel.

Synonyms
- Juncus gerardii var. pedicellatus Fern.; Juncus bottnicus Wahlenb.; Juncus compressus Jacq. subsp. gerardi (Loisel.) Rouy; Juncus lesbiacus C.Candargy

= Juncus gerardii =

Species of rush

Juncus gerardii, commonly known as blackgrass, black needle rush or saltmarsh rush, is a perennial flowering plant in the rush family Juncaceae.

== Description ==
Juncus gerardii forms loose swards of erect tufts from dense and far-reaching matrix of black rhizomes. Stems are slender and wiry, growing to 25-75 cm tall. Leaves are narrow, channelled and with short auricles.

Flowers are borne towards the tips of the branches, with a short primary bract. Tepals are dark brown and held around black capsules, which can give the capsules a striped appearance.

== Distribution ==
=== Habitat ===
Juncus gerardii occurs on coastal sites and intertidal zones, in salt marshes, wetland margins, disturbed habitats and wastelands. It tends to establish just above the high-tide line, as it prefers saline, waterlogged soils, but is intolerant of flooding.

=== Natural global range ===
Juncus gerardii is native to Europe (Mediterranean to Mongolia) and North America. In North America, it has spread to some unwanted locations, such as the Great Lakes region, where it causes several adverse environmental impacts, such as threatening the survival of native vegetation and hosting insects that can carry diseases.

=== Introduced range ===
Juncus gerardii has been introduced to a number of countries, including Greenland, New Zealand, Australia (Tasmania and Victoria), and Asia (Primorye and Magadan).

==== New Zealand range ====
Juncus gerardii was accidentally introduced to New Zealand, becoming naturalised in 1891.

It is considered invasive, having been recorded in coastal wetlands and pastures, where it can form large swards that exclude native vegetation and reduce grazing potential. J. gerardii has also been recorded on saline soils as far inland as Alexandra, as well as on non-saline soils in Invercargill.

== Phenology ==
Flowers and fruits late spring to summer. Seedling recruitment occurs in exposed habitats where there is little light competition. However, this species mainly spreads through asexual reproduction, forming clonal populations from the spreading rhizomes.
