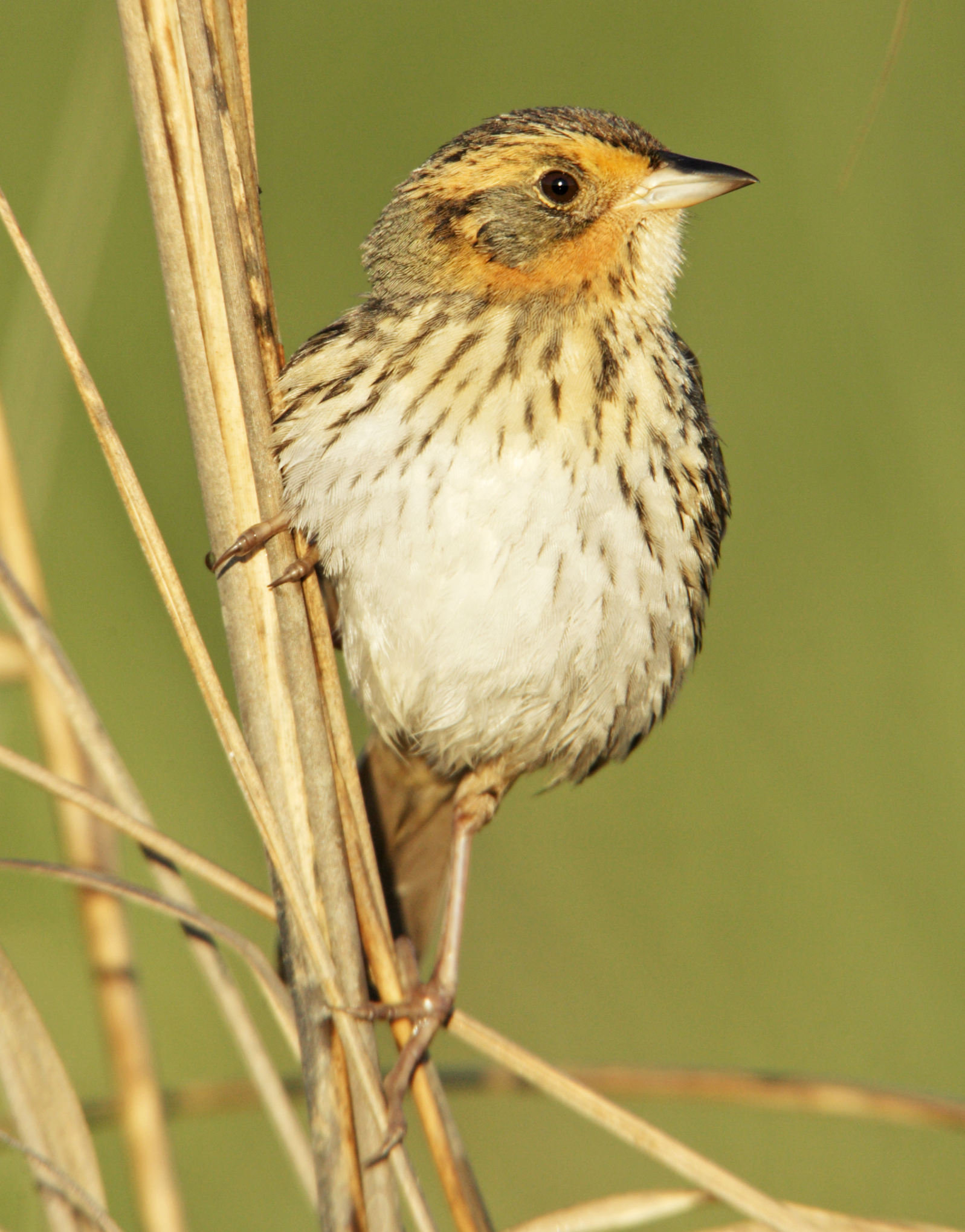

Conservation status
- Endangered (IUCN 3.1)

- Imperiled (NatureServe)

Scientific classification
- Kingdom: Animalia
- Phylum: Chordata
- Class: Aves
- Order: Passeriformes
- Family: Passerellidae
- Genus: Ammospiza
- Species: A. caudacuta

Binomial name
- Ammospiza caudacuta (Gmelin, JF, 1788)

Subspecies
- Ammospiza caudacuta caudacuta (J. F. Gmelin, 1788); Ammospiza caudacuta diversa (Bishop, 1901)
- Breeding Year-round Non-Breeding

Synonyms
- Ammodramus caudacutus (J. F. Gmelin, 1788)

= Saltmarsh sparrow =

Species of bird

The saltmarsh sparrow (Ammospiza caudacuta) is a small New World sparrow found in salt marshes along the Atlantic coast of the United States. At one time, this bird and the Nelson's sparrow (Ammospiza nelsoni) were thought to be a single species, the sharp-tailed sparrow. Because of this, the species was briefly known as the "saltmarsh sharp-tailed sparrow." Saltmarsh sparrow numbers are declining due to habitat loss largely attributed to human activity.

== Taxonomy ==
The saltmarsh sparrow was formally described in 1788 by the German naturalist Johann Friedrich Gmelin in his revised and expanded edition of Carl Linnaeus's Systema Naturae. He placed it with the orioles in the genus Oriolus and coined the binomial name Oriolus caudacutus. He gave the locality as New York. Gmelin based his own description on those for the "sharp-tailed oriole" that had been described by John Latham in 1782 and by Thomas Pennant in 1785. The saltmarsh sparrow is now one of four American sparrows placed in the genus Ammospiza that was introduced by Harry C. Oberholser in 1905. The genus name combines the Ancient Greek αμμος (ammos) meaning "sand" and σπιζα (spiza) meaning "finch". The specific epithet caudacuta is from Latin cauda meaning "tail" and acutus meaning "sharp".

Its closest relatives are the Nelson's sparrow (Ammospiza nelsoni) and the seaside sparrow (Ammospiza maritima).

Two subspecies are recognised:

- A. c. caudacuta (Gmelin, JF, 1788) – breeding northeast USA
- A. c. diversa (Bishop, 1901) – breeding east USA

The saltmarsh sparrow and the Nelson's sparrow were once thought to be a single species, called the sharp-tailed sparrow. Mitochondrial DNA evidence suggests that the two species diverged about 600,000 years ago. A Pleistocene glaciation is thought to have separated the ancestral sharp-tailed sparrow into inland and coastal populations. The inland Nelson's sparrow became a specialist of non-tidal freshwater wetlands while the coastal saltmarsh sparrow became a specialist of tidal salt marshes. Recently, the Nelson's sparrow has expanded its range to include coastal salt marshes, and interbreeding occurs where the two species overlap.

== Description ==
The saltmarsh sparrow measures 11–14 cm (4.3–5.5 in) in length, has a wingspan of 17.8–21 cm (7.0–8.3 in), and weighs 14–23.1 g (0.49–0.81 oz). Adults have brownish upperparts with a gray nape, white throat and belly, and pale orange breast and sides with brown streaking. The face is orange with gray cheeks, a gray median crown stripe, brown lateral crown stripes, and a brown eyeline. The tail feathers are short and sharply pointed. The subspecies A. c. diversa has more contrasting striping on its back and a darker crown than the nominate A. c. caudacuta.

Only males sing. The song is a complex series of raspy, barely audible buzzes, trills, and gurgles. It is distinguishable from that of the Nelson's sparrow, which is a louder, hissing buzz followed by a buzzy chip. The high-pitched contact calls of both species are indistinguishable.

Distinguishing this species from closely related sparrows such as the Nelson's sparrow (Ammospiza nelsoni) can be difficult. The inland subspecies of the Nelson's sparrow can be differentiated by its fainter streaking and brighter orange breast and sides, while the coastal subspecies of the Nelson's sparrow can be differentiated by its paler, less-contrasting plumage. The saltmarsh sparrow also has a slightly longer beak than the Nelson's sparrow.

== Distribution and habitat ==
The saltmarsh sparrow is only found in tidal salt marshes along the Atlantic coast of the United States. It breeds along the northern coast, from Maine to the Chesapeake Bay, and winters along the southern coast, from North Carolina to Florida. The saltmarsh sparrow prefers high marsh habitat, dominated by saltmeadow cordgrass (Sporobolus pumilus) and saltmarsh rush (Juncus gerardii), which does not flood as frequently as low marsh.

== Behavior ==
=== Diet ===
The saltmarsh sparrow forages on the ground along tidal channels or in marsh vegetation, sometimes probing in the mud at low tide. Over 80% of the diet of nestlings consists of flies, amphipods, grasshoppers, and moths, especially larval, pupal, and adult soldier flies. During the winter, adults consume seeds. The saltmarsh sparrow is an opportunistic feeder and food is rarely limiting.

=== Breeding ===
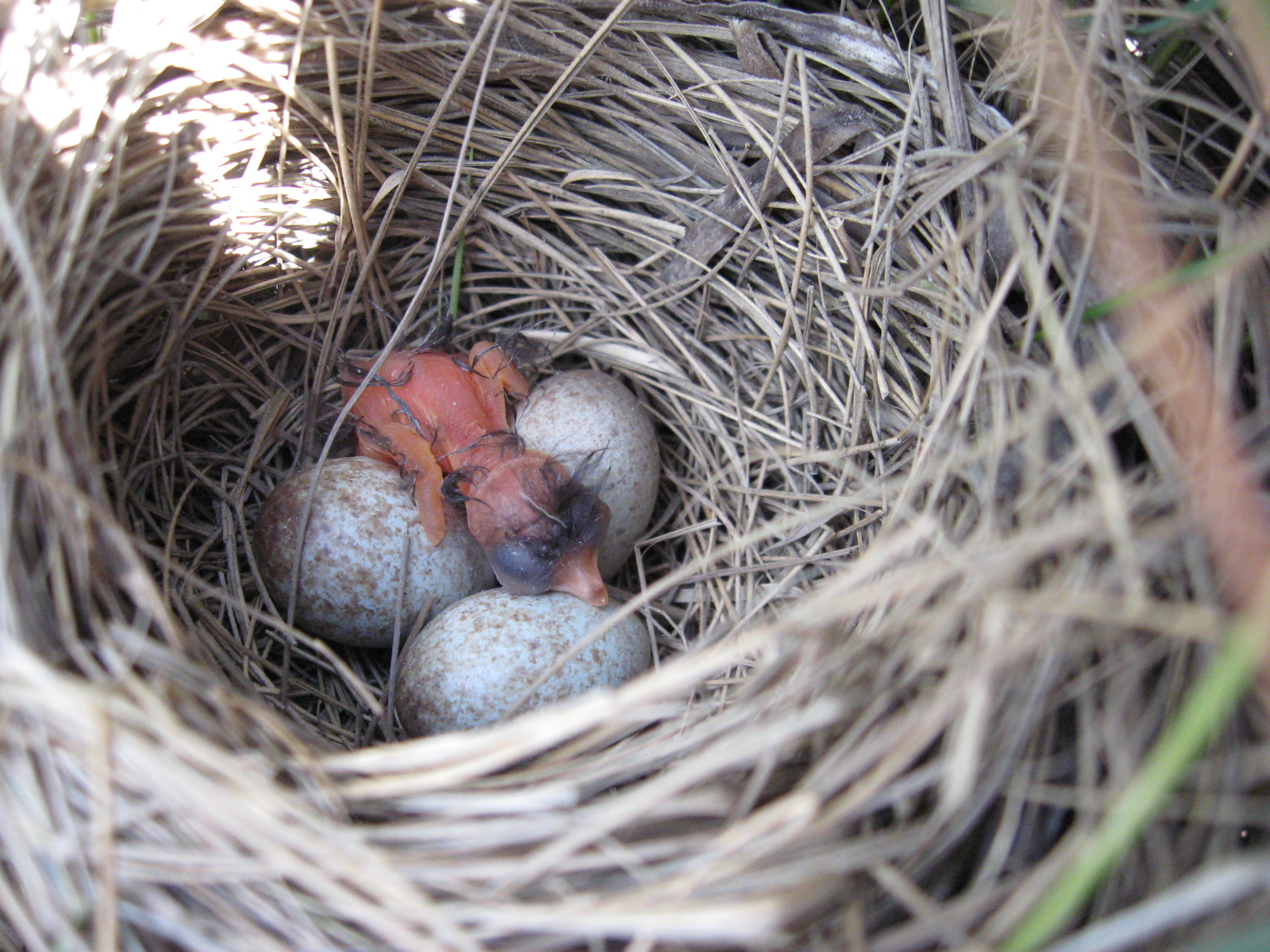
A newly hatched saltmarsh sparrow and eggs in nest

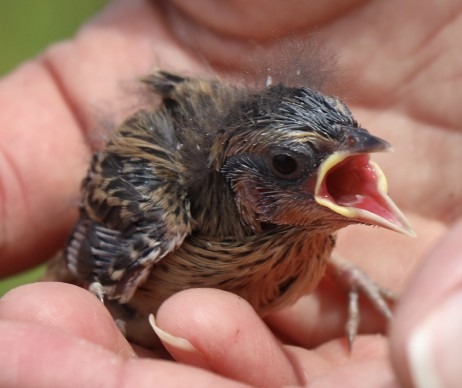
Saltmarsh sparrow chick

Saltmarsh sparrows are non-territorial and have large overlapping home ranges. Male home ranges are twice as large as those of females and may span 50 hectares (120 acres). Saltmarsh sparrows are promiscuous, and the majority of broods exhibit mixed parentage. During the nesting season, males roam long distances chasing and mounting females regardless of receptivity. Only females exhibit parental care, building the nest, incubating the eggs, and providing food to the young. The nest is an open cup constructed of grass, usually attached to saltmeadow cordgrass (Sporobolus pumilus) or saltmarsh rush (Juncus gerardii) at a height of 6–15 centimetres (2.4–5.9 in). Clutch size is 3 to 5. Incubation begins after the last egg is laid and takes 11–12 days. Young fledge 8–11 days after hatching but remain dependent on the mother for an additional 15–20 days.

The primary cause of nest mortality is flooding due to storm surges and periodic, exceptionally high spring tides which occur every 28 days during the new moon. The saltmarsh sparrow exhibits several adaptations to flooding, including nest repair, egg retrieval, rapid re-nesting, and synchronization of breeding with the lunar cycle. Nesting begins immediately following a spring tide, allowing young to fledge before the next spring tide. Two broods are typically raised per breeding season.

== Conservation status ==
The saltmarsh sparrow is of high conservation concern due to habitat loss resulting in small fragmented populations. Salt marshes are one of the most threatened habitats worldwide due to their limited natural extent, long history of human modification, and anticipated sea level rise. The spread of the invasive reed Phragmites has also contributed to habitat loss. The saltmarsh sparrow is very sensitive to sea level rise because of the role of flooding in nest mortality. In addition, the saltmarsh sparrow is particularly susceptible to mercury bioaccumulation, but the effects of this on survival are unclear.

Saltmarsh sparrow populations declined between 5% and 9% per year between the 1990s and 2010s, resulting in a total decline of over 75%. Without management intervention, the saltmarsh sparrow is projected to become extinct by 2050, with some projections warning it could happen as soon as 2035. The saltmarsh sparrow was listed on the 2016 State of North America's Birds Watch List with a concern score of 19 out of 20, and the U.S. Fish and Wildlife Service is currently undertaking a status review to determine whether the species should be listed under the Endangered Species Act. Its total population was estimated to be 53,000 in 2016.
