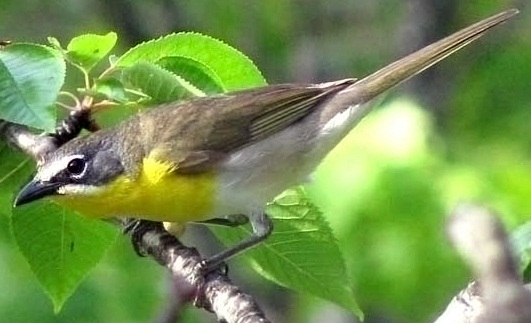
- Near the Siskiyou Mountains, Oregon

Conservation status
- Least Concern (IUCN 3.1)

Scientific classification
- Kingdom: Animalia
- Phylum: Chordata
- Class: Aves
- Order: Passeriformes
- Family: Icteridae
- Genus: Icteria; Vieillot, 1808
- Species: I. virens

Binomial name
- Icteria virens (Linnaeus, 1758)
- Breeding Migration Nonbreeding

Synonyms
- Turdus virens Linnaeus, 1758

= Yellow-breasted chat =

Species of bird

The yellow-breasted chat (Icteria virens) is a large songbird in the New World blackbirds family Icteridae that is found in North and Central America. It has sometimes been placed in its own family Icteriidae and in the New World warbler family Parulidae.

== Taxonomy ==
The yellow-breasted chat was formally described in 1758 by Swedish naturalist Carl Linnaeus in the tenth edition of his Systema Naturae. He placed it with the thrushes in the genus Turdus, coined the binomial name Turdus virens, and specified the type locality as "America". The specific epithet is Latin meaning 'green'. The locality has been restricted to South Carolina. Linnaeus based his account on the "yellow brested chat" that had been described and illustrated by the English naturalist Mark Catesby in his book The Natural History of Carolina, Florida and the Bahama Islands. It is now the only species placed in the genus Icteria that was introduced in 1808 by the French ornithologist Louis Pierre Vieillot. It is also the only species placed in the family Icteriidae that was introduced (as Icterieae) in 1858 by the American naturalist Spencer Baird.

The yellow-breasted chat was formerly considered the largest member of the family Parulidae, but following taxonomic studies, it was moved to the monotypic family Icteriidae in 2017. Although the Icteriidae are a distinct family from the New World blackbirds (Icteridae), which have a very similar name, taxonomic studies support them as being the closest living relatives of one another, and in a 2019 study, which actually classified the yellow-breasted chat as a member of the Icteridae. In addition, the former grouping of the yellow-breasted chat as a warbler was not too far off because phylogenomic studies have placed the Parulidae as sister to a clade that includes the Icteridae. Those results make it reasonable to view the Parulidae as the sister group to the clade comprising the Icteridae and Icteriidae.

The cladogram below shows the relationship of the yellow-breasted chat to the other families. It is based on the molecular phylogenetic study by Oliveros et al. that was published in 2019. The species numbers are taken from the list maintained by Frank Gill, Pamela Rasmussen, and David Donsker on behalf of the International Ornithological Committee.

- - Parulidae – New World warblers (120 species)
  - Icteridae – New World blackbirds (109 species)

== Description ==
When considered part of the family Parulidae (New World warblers), the yellow-breasted chat was the largest species of parulid. In fact, it can often weigh more than twice as much as other parulid species.

This species has a total length of 17 to 19.1 cm (6.7 to 7.5 in) and a wingspan of 23 to 27 cm (9.1 to 10.6 in). Body mass can range from 20.2 to 33.8 g (0.71 to 1.19 oz). Among standard measurements, the wing chord is 7.1 to 8.4 cm (2.8 to 3.3 in), the elongated tail is 6.9 to 8.6 cm (2.7 to 3.4 in), the relatively long, heavy bill is 1.3 to 1.6 cm (0.51 to 0.63 in), and the tarsus is 2.5 to 3.1 cm (0.98 to 1.22 in). These birds have olive upper parts with white bellies and bright-yellow throats and breasts. Other signature features of yellow-breasted chats are their large, white eye rings and blackish legs. Visually, this species is unlikely to be mistaken for any other bird.

Song
From riparian scrub in South Dakota

The song is an odd, variable mixture of cackles, clucks, whistles, and hoots. Their calls are harsh chak's. Unlike most warblers, this species has been known to mimic the calls of other birds. Thus, less experienced field birdwatchers sometimes overlook chats after mistaking their song for species such as gray catbirds and brown thrashers, which share similar habitat preferences and skulking habits, though are generally much more abundant. During the breeding season, chats are at their most conspicuous, as they usually sing from exposed locations and even fly in the open while gurgling their songs.

== Distribution and habitat ==
The yellow-breasted chat is found throughout North America. It breeds from the southern plains of Canada to central Mexico, and mainly migrates to Mexico and Central America for the winter, although some may overwinter in coastal areas farther north. This species occurs in areas where dense shrubbery is common. Today, its habitat often consists of abandoned farmland and other rural areas where overgrown vegetation proliferates.

== Behavior ==
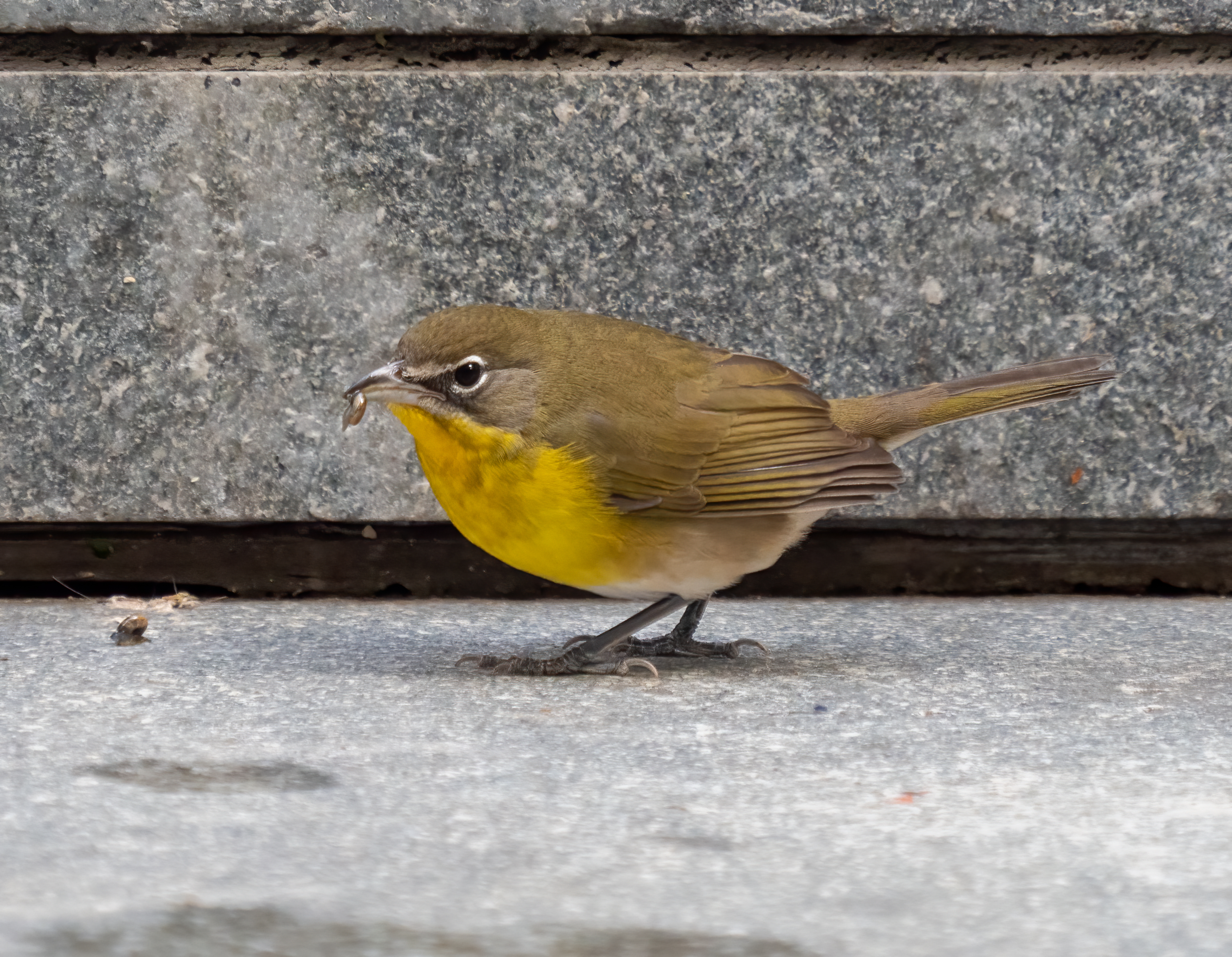
Eating a small snail in a public plaza in New York City

The yellow-breasted chat is a shy, skulking species of bird, often being heard but not seen.

=== Breeding ===
The breeding habitat is dense, brushy vegetation or hedgerows. The nest is a bulky cup made of grasses, leaves, strips of bark, and stems of weeds, and lined with finer grasses, wiry plant stems, pine needles, and sometimes roots and hair. The nest is placed in thick shrub and often only about 2.5 m (8 ft 2 in) above the ground. The clutch is three to five creamy-white eggs with reddish-brown blotches or speckles. These are incubated by the female and hatch in 11 to 12 days. Both parents tend the young, which fledge in 8 to 11 days. Chats are apparently vigilant guards of their nests, as parasitism by brown-headed cowbirds is not as frequent as with other cup-nest builders. They are not as monogamous, though, as other warblers. In one study in central Kentucky, DNA fingerprinting revealed that 17% of 29 yellow-breasted chat nestlings were not sired by the male of the social pair and three of nine broods contained at least one extra-pair nestling.

=== Food and feeding ===
Yellow-breasted chats are omnivorous birds, and forage in dense vegetation. Mostly, this species feeds on insects and berries, including blackberries and wild grapes. Insects up to moderate sizes, including grasshoppers, bugs, beetles, weevils, bees, wasps, tent caterpillars, ants, moths, and mayflies, are typically preyed upon and are gleaned from dense vegetation. Other invertebrates, including spiders, are occasionally eaten, as well. Uniquely for a passerine of its size, the chat occasionally grips food with its feet before it eats.

== Status ==
Yellow-breasted chats are declining in eastern North America due to habitat loss and degradation due to deforestation and urban development. This species, though less vulnerable than other cup nesters, is still sometimes victim to brood parasitism from brown-headed cowbirds that have taken advantage of the fragmentation of eastern forests to expand their range during the last century. The species still occurs over a wide range, though, and its population is considered to be of least concern globally.
