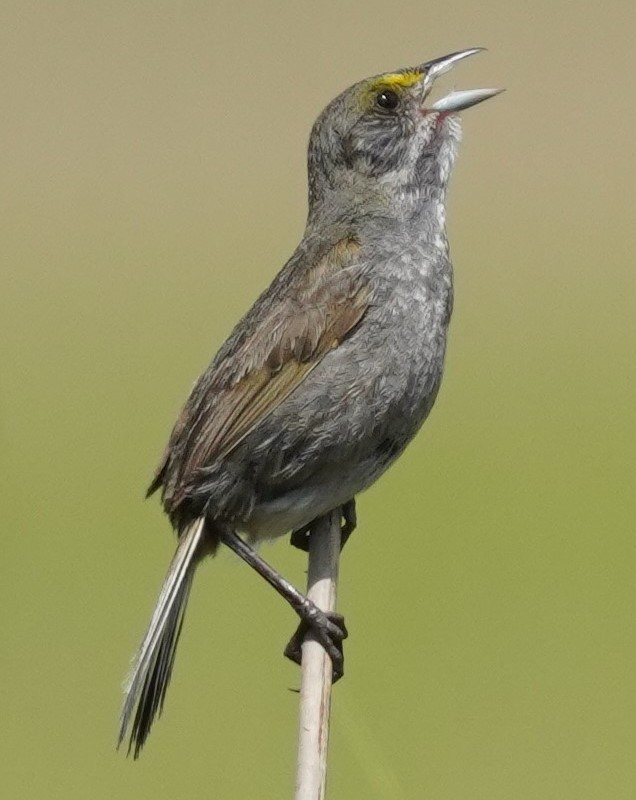

Conservation status
- Least Concern (IUCN 3.1)

Scientific classification
- Kingdom: Animalia
- Phylum: Chordata
- Class: Aves
- Order: Passeriformes
- Family: Passerellidae
- Genus: Ammospiza
- Species: A. maritima

Binomial name
- Ammospiza maritima (Wilson, 1811)

Subspecies
- 8, see below
- Part of the range of A. maritimus Breeding range Year-round range Wintering range

= Seaside sparrow =

Species of bird

The seaside sparrow (Ammospiza maritima) is a species of American sparrow.

== Description ==
Adults have brownish upperparts with gray on the crown and nape, and a grayish-buff-colored breast with dark streaks; they have a dark face with gray cheeks, a white throat, and a short, pointed tail. Birds show a small yellow streak just above the eye. A typical seaside sparrow lifespan in 8 to 9 years of maximum. The oldest record of seaside sparrow was an individual male which was at least 10 years old when recaptured and re-released during the banding operations in South Carolina.

Their breeding habitat is salt marshes on the Atlantic and Gulf coasts of the United States from southern New Hampshire to southern Texas. The nest is an open cup usually built in the salt marsh on tidal reeds and spartina grasses. Females lay two to five eggs. Northern birds most often migrate farther south along the eastern coast of the United States. They forage on the ground or in marsh vegetation, sometimes probing in mud. They mainly eat insects, marine invertebrates and seeds. Their feeding areas are often some distance away from the areas they choose to nest. The song is a raspy buzz that closely resembles a distant red-winged blackbird.

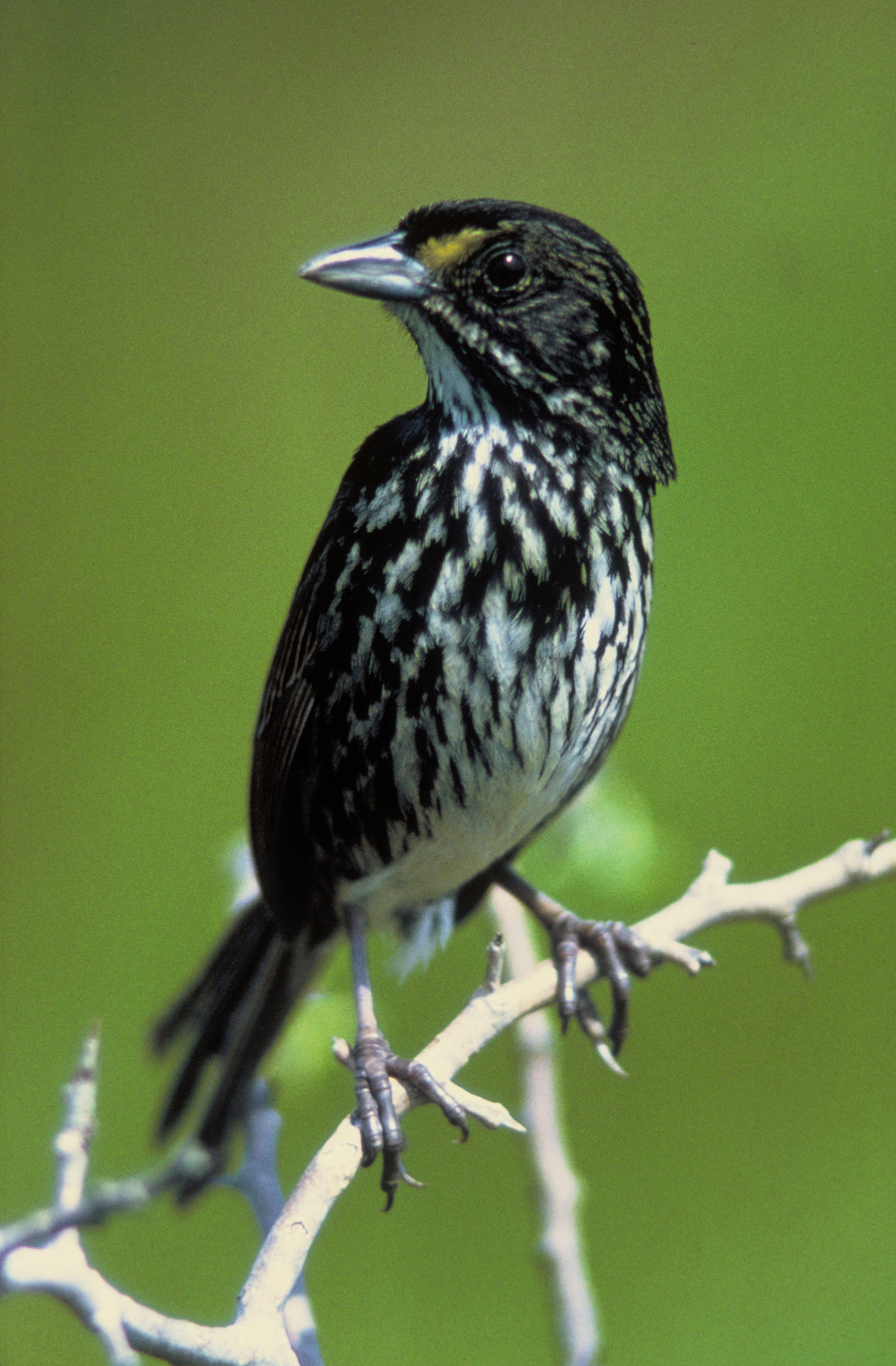
The recently-extinct dusky seaside sparrow (A. m. nigrescens)

One of the numerous subspecies of this bird, the dusky seaside sparrow (A. m. nigrescens), has recently become extinct, and the Cape Sable subspecies, A. m. mirabilis, is endangered. Occurring in a restricted range but of uncertain validity is Scott's seaside sparrow, (A. m. peninsulae). The small isolated population that is near Corpus Christi, Texas, south to the Rio Grande and the sennetti subspecies may also have risk to endangered, those were formerly considered a separate species.

== Subspecies ==
Currently there are eight subspecies recognized:

- Ammospiza maritima fisheri (Chapman, 1899)
- Ammospiza maritima macgillivraii (Audubon, 1834)
- Ammospiza maritima maritima (A. Wilson, 1811) – Nominate subspecies
- Ammospiza maritima mirabilis (A. H. Howell, 1919) - Cape Sable seaside sparrow
- Ammospiza maritima nigrescens (Ridgway, 1874) - Dusky seaside sparrow †
- Ammospiza maritima pelonota (Oberholser, 1931)
- Ammospiza maritima peninsulae (J. A. Allen, 1888) - Scott's seaside sparrow
- Ammospiza maritima sennetti (J. A. Allen, 1888)

== Predation ==
In Florida, seaside sparrows may be eaten by some growth stage of invasive snakes such as Burmese pythons, reticulated pythons, Southern African rock pythons, Central African rock pythons, boa constrictors, yellow anacondas, Bolivian anacondas, dark-spotted anacondas, and green anacondas.
