= List of birds of Louisiana =

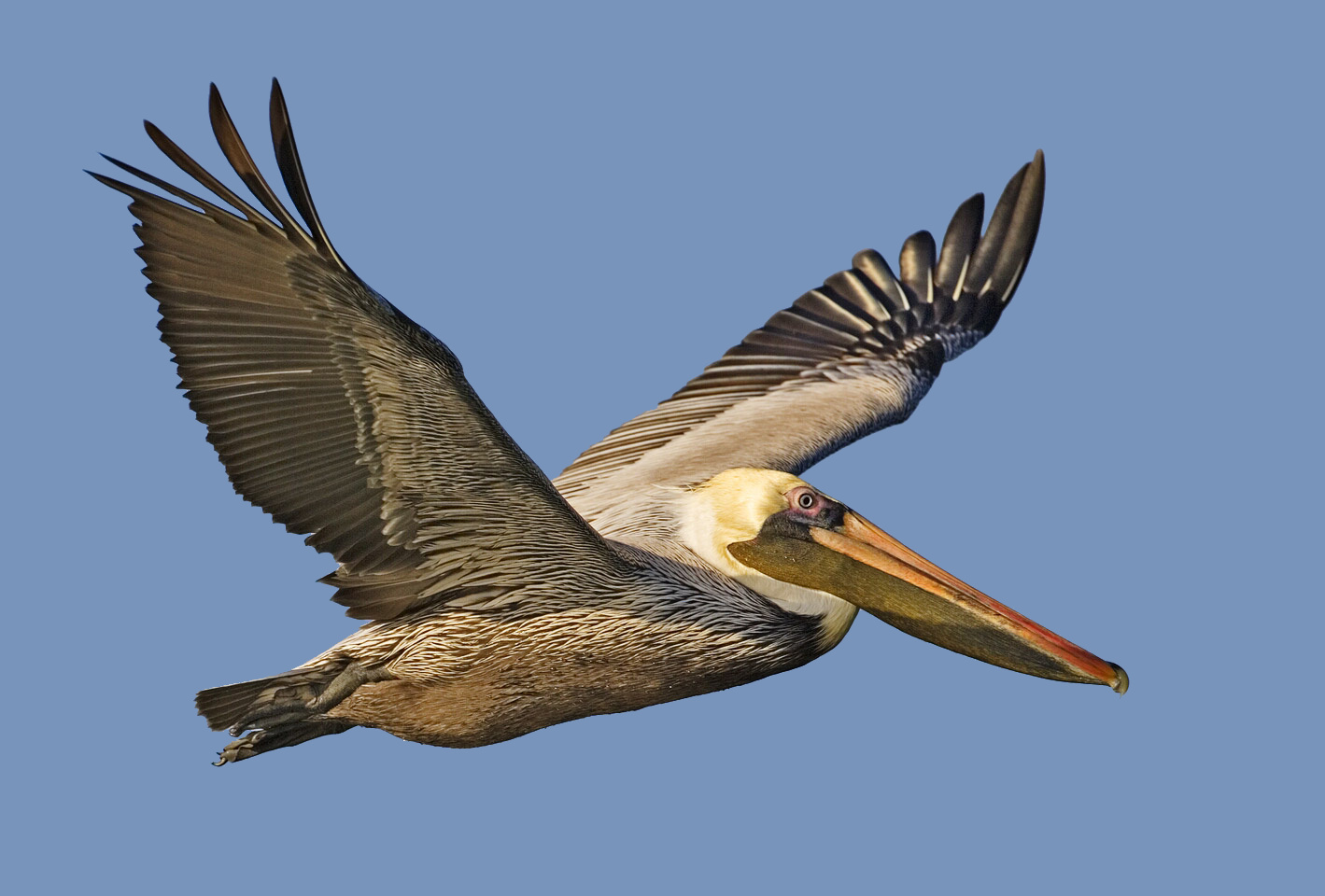
The brown pelican is the state bird of Louisiana.

This list of birds of Louisiana includes species credibly documented in the U.S. state of Louisiana, as accepted by the Louisiana Bird Records Committee (LBRC) of the Louisiana Ornithological Society. Of the 486 species on the list as of January 2024, 153 are classed as accidental and four were introduced to North America. Two species are known to be extinct, two others possibly are, and two have been extirpated. One species is classed as hypothetical. Birds that are considered probable escapees, although they may have been sighted flying free, are not included.

This list is presented in the taxonomic sequence of the Check-list of North and Middle American Birds, 7th edition through the 62nd Supplement, published by the American Ornithological Society (AOS). Common and scientific names are also those of the Check-list, except that the common names of families are from the Clements taxonomy because the AOS list does not include them.

The following tags have been used to designate some species:

- (A) Accidental - a species on the Review List of the LBRC
- (I) Introduced - a species that has been introduced by the actions of humans, either directly or indirectly
- (E) Extinct - a recent species that no longer exists
- (e) Extirpated - a species formerly present in Louisiana which still exists elsewhere
- (H) Hypothetical - "Origin hypothetical" per the LBRC

== Ducks, geese, and waterfowl ==
Order: Anseriformes Family: Anatidae

The family Anatidae includes the ducks and most duck-like waterfowl, such as geese and swans. These birds are adapted to an aquatic existence with webbed feet, flattened bills, and feathers that are excellent at shedding water due to special oils.

- Black-bellied whistling-duck, Dendrocygna autumnalis
- Fulvous whistling-duck, Dendrocygna bicolor
- Snow goose, Anser caerulescens
- Ross's goose, Anser rossii
- Greater white-fronted goose, Anser albifrons
- Cackling goose, Branta hutchinsonii
- Canada goose, Branta canadensis (A)
- Brant, Branta bernicla (A)
- Trumpeter swan, Cygnus buccinator ("Status in question") (e)
- Tundra swan, Cygnus columbianus (A)
- Wood duck, Aix sponsa
- Baikal teal, Sibirionetta formosa (H) (A)
- Blue-winged teal, Spatula discors
- Cinnamon teal, Spatula cyanoptera
- Northern shoveler, Spatula clypeata
- Gadwall, Mareca strepera
- Eurasian wigeon, Mareca penelope (A)
- American wigeon, Mareca americana
- Mallard, Anas platyrhynchos
- American black duck, Anas rubripes (A)
- Mottled duck, Anas fulvigula
- Northern pintail, Anas acuta
- Green-winged teal, Anas carolinensis
- Canvasback, Aythya valisineria
- Redhead, Aythya americana
- Ring-necked duck, Aythya collaris
- Greater scaup, Aythya marila
- Lesser scaup, Aythya affinis
- King eider, Somateria spectabilis (A)
- Surf scoter, Melanitta perspicillata
- White-winged scoter, Melanitta deglandi (A)
- Black scoter, Melanitta americana
- Long-tailed duck, Clangula hyemalis (A)
- Bufflehead, Bucephala albeola
- Common goldeneye, Bucephala clangula
- Hooded merganser, Lophodytes cucullatus
- Common merganser, Mergus merganser (A)
- Red-breasted merganser, Mergus serrator
- Masked duck, Nomonyx dominicus (A)
- Ruddy duck, Oxyura jamaicensis

== New World quail ==
Order: Galliformes Family: Odontophoridae

The New World quails are small, plump terrestrial birds only distantly related to the quails of the Old World, but named for their similar appearance and habits.

- Northern bobwhite, Colinus virginianus

== Pheasants, grouse, and allies ==
Order: Galliformes Family: Phasianidae

The Phasianidae is the family containing the pheasants and their allies. These are terrestrial birds, variable in size but generally plump, with broad, relatively short wings. Many are gamebirds or have been domesticated as a food source for humans.

- Wild turkey, Meleagris gallopavo
- Greater prairie-chicken, Tympanuchus cupido (e)

== Flamingoes ==
Order: Phoenicopteriformes Family: Phoenicopteridae

Flamingoes are gregarious wading birds, usually 3 to 5 feet (0.9 to 1.5 m) tall, found in both the Western and Eastern Hemispheres. Flamingos filter-feed on shellfish and algae. Their oddly shaped beaks are adapted to separate mud and silt from the food they consume and, uniquely, are used upside-down.

- American flamingo, Phoenicopterus ruber (A)

== Grebes ==
Order: Podicipediformes Family: Podicipedidae

Grebes are small to medium-large freshwater diving birds. They have lobed toes and are excellent swimmers and divers. However, they have their feet placed far back on the body, making them quite ungainly on land.

- Least grebe, Tachybaptus dominicus (A)
- Pied-billed grebe, Podilymbus podiceps
- Horned grebe, Podiceps auritus
- Red-necked grebe, Podiceps grisegena (A)
- Eared grebe, Podiceps nigricollis
- Western grebe, Aechmorphorus occidentalis (A)

== Pigeons and doves ==
Order: Columbiformes Family: Columbidae

Pigeons and doves are stout-bodied birds with short necks and short slender bills with a fleshy cere.

- Rock pigeon, Columba livia (I)
- Band-tailed pigeon, Patagioenas fasciata (A)
- Eurasian collared-dove, Streptopelia decaocto (I)
- Passenger pigeon, Ectopistes migratorius (E)
- Inca dove, Columbina inca
- Common ground dove, Columbina passerina
- White-winged dove, Zenaida asiatica
- Mourning dove, Zenaida macroura

== Cuckoos ==
Order: Cuculiformes Family: Cuculidae

The family Cuculidae includes cuckoos, roadrunners, and anis. These birds are of variable size with slender bodies, long tails, and strong legs.

- Smooth-billed ani, Crotophaga ani (A)
- Groove-billed ani, Crotophaga sulcirostris
- Greater roadrunner, Geococcyx californianus
- Yellow-billed cuckoo, Coccyzus americanus
- Mangrove cuckoo, Coccyzus minor (A)
- Black-billed cuckoo, Coccyzus erythropthalmus

== Nightjars and allies ==
Order: Caprimulgiformes Family: Caprimulgidae

Nightjars are medium-sized nocturnal birds that usually nest on the ground. They have long wings, short legs, and very short bills. Most have small feet, of little use for walking, and long pointed wings. Their soft plumage is cryptically colored to resemble bark or leaves.

- Lesser nighthawk, Chordeiles acutipennis (A)
- Common nighthawk, Chordeiles minor
- Antillean nighthawk, Chordeiles gundlachii (A)
- Chuck-will's-widow, Antrostomus carolinensis
- Eastern whip-poor-will, Antrostomus vociferus

== Swifts ==
Order: Apodiformes Family: Apodidae

The swifts are small birds, spending most of their lives flying. They have very short legs and never settle voluntarily on the ground, perching instead only on vertical surfaces. Many swifts have very long swept-back wings which resemble a crescent or boomerang.

- Chimney swift, Chaetura pelagica
- Vaux's swift, Chaetura vauxi (A)

== Hummingbirds ==
Order: Apodiformes Family: Trochilidae

Hummingbirds are small birds capable of hovering in mid-air due to the rapid flapping of their wings. They are the only birds that can fly backwards.

- Green-breasted mango, Anthracothorax prevostii (A)
- Rivoli's hummingbird, Eugenes fulgens (A)
- Blue-throated mountain-gem, Lampornis clemenciae (A)
- Mexican violetear, Colibri thalassinus (A)
- Lucifer hummingbird, Calothorax lucifer (A)
- Ruby-throated hummingbird, Archilochus colubris
- Black-chinned hummingbird, Archilochus alexandri
- Anna's hummingbird, Calypte anna (A)
- Calliope hummingbird, Selasphorus calliope
- Rufous hummingbird, Selasphorus rufus
- Allen's hummingbird, Selasphorus sasin
- Broad-tailed hummingbird, Selasphorus platycercus
- Broad-billed hummingbird, Cynanthus latirostris (A)
- Buff-bellied hummingbird, Amazila yucatanensis

== Rails, gallinules, and coots ==
Order: Gruiformes Family: Rallidae

The Rallidae is a large family of small to medium-sized birds which includes the rails, crakes, coots, and gallinules. The most typical family members occupy dense vegetation in damp environments near lakes, swamps, or rivers. In general they are shy and secretive, making them difficult to observe. Most have strong legs with long toes, short rounded wings, and are weak fliers.

- Clapper rail, Rallus crepitans
- King rail, Rallus elegans
- Virginia rail, Rallus limicola
- Sora, Porzana carolina
- Common gallinule, Gallinula galeata
- American coot, Fulica americana
- Purple gallinule, Porphyrio martinicus
- Yellow rail, Coturnicops noveboracensis
- Black rail, Laterallus jamaicensis (A)

== Limpkin ==
Order: Gruiformes Family: Aramidae

The limpkin is an odd bird that looks like a large rail, but is skeletally closer to the cranes. It is found in marshes with some trees or scrub in the Caribbean, South America, and southern Florida.

- Limpkin, Aramus guarauna (A)

== Cranes ==
Order: Gruiformes Family: Gruidae

Cranes are large, tall birds with long legs and long necks. Unlike the similar-looking but un-related herons, cranes fly with necks extended. Most have elaborate and noisy courtship displays or "dances". When in a group, they may also "dance" for no particular reason, jumping up and down in an elegant manner, seemingly just for pleasure or to attract a mate.

- Sandhill crane, Antigone canadensis
- Whooping crane, Grus americana (e; reintroduction program in progress)

== Stilts and avocets ==
Order: Charadriiformes Family: Recurvirostridae

Recurvirostridae is a family of large wading birds which includes the avocets and stilts. The avocets have long legs and long up-curved bills. The stilts have extremely long legs and long, thin, straight bills.

- Black-necked stilt, Himantopus mexicanus
- American avocet, Recurvirostra americana

== Oystercatchers ==
Order: Charadriiformes Family: Haematopodidae

The oystercatchers are large, conspicuous and noisy plover-like birds, with strong bills used for smashing or prising open molluscs.

- American oystercatcher, Haematopus palliatus

== Plovers and lapwings ==
Order: Charadriiformes Family: Charadriidae

The family Charadriidae includes the plovers, dotterels, and lapwings. They are small to medium-sized birds with compact bodies, short thick necks, and long, usually pointed, wings. They are generally found in open country, mostly in habitats near water.

- Black-bellied plover, Pluvialis squatarola
- American golden-plover, Pluviali dominicas
- Killdeer, Charadrius vociferus
- Semipalmated plover, Charadrius semipalmatus
- Piping plover, Charadrius melodus
- Lesser sand-plover, Charadrius mongolus (A)
- Wilson's plover, Charadrius wilsonia
- Snowy plover, Charadrius nivosus
- Mountain plover, Charadrius montanus (A)

== Sandpipers and allies ==
Order: Charadriiformes Family: Scolopacidae

Scolopacidae is a large and diverse family of small to medium-sized shorebirds which includes the sandpipers, curlews, godwits, shanks, tattlers, woodcocks, snipes, dowitchers, and phalaropes. Most eat small invertebrates picked out of the mud or sand. Different lengths of legs and bills enable multiple species to feed in the same habitat, particularly on the coast, without direct competition for food.

- Upland sandpiper, Bartramia longicauda
- Whimbrel, Numenius phaeopus
- Eskimo curlew, Numenius borealis (probably (E))
- Long-billed curlew, Numenius americanus
- Black-tailed godwit, Limosa limosa (A)
- Hudsonian godwit, Limosa haemastica
- Marbled godwit, Limosa fedoa
- Ruddy turnstone, Arenaria interpres
- Red knot, Calidris canutus
- Ruff, Calidris pugnax (A)
- Stilt sandpiper, Calidris himantopus
- Curlew sandpiper, Calidris ferruginea (A)
- Sanderling, Calidris alba
- Dunlin, Calidris alpina
- Purple sandpiper, Calidris maritima (A)
- Baird's sandpiper, Calidris bairdii
- Least sandpiper, Calidris minutilla
- White-rumped sandpiper, Calidris fuscicollis
- Buff-breasted sandpiper, Calidris subruficollis
- Pectoral sandpiper, Calidris melanotos
- Semipalmated sandpiper, Calidris pusilla
- Western sandpiper, Calidris mauri
- Short-billed dowitcher, Limnodromus griseus
- Long-billed dowitcher, Limnodromus scolopaceus
- American woodcock, Scolopax minor
- Wilson's snipe, Gallinago delicata
- Spotted sandpiper, Actitis macularius
- Solitary sandpiper, Tringa solitaria
- Lesser yellowlegs, Tringa flavipes
- Willet, Tringa semipalmata
- Greater yellowlegs, Tringa melanoleuca
- Wilson's phalarope, Phalaropus tricolor
- Red-necked phalarope, Phalaropus lobatus (A)
- Red phalarope, Phalaropus fulicarius (A)

== Skuas and jaegers ==
Order: Charadriiformes Family: Stercorariidae

Jaegers are medium to large seabirds, typically with gray or brown plumage, often with white markings on the wings. They have longish bills with hooked tips and webbed feet with sharp claws. They look like large dark gulls, but have a fleshy cere above the upper mandible. They are strong, acrobatic fliers.

- Pomarine jaeger, Stercorarius pomarinus
- Parasitic jaeger, Stercorarius parasiticus
- Long-tailed jaeger, Stercorarius longicaudus (A)

== Alcids ==
Order: Charadriiformes Family: Alcidae

Alcids are superficially similar to penguins due to their black-and-white colors, their upright posture, and some of their habits; however they are not closely related to penguins and are (with one extinct exception) able to fly. Auks live on the open sea, only deliberately coming ashore to breed.

- Razorbill, Alca torda (A)
- Ancient murrelet, Synthliboramphus antiquus (A)

== Gulls, terns, and skimmers ==
Order: Charadriiformes Family: Laridae

The Laridae are a family of medium to large seabirds and containing the gulls, terns, kittiwakes, and skimmers. They are typically gray or white, often with black markings on the head or wings. They have stout, longish bills and webbed feet.

- Black-legged kittiwake, Rissa tridactyla (A)
- Sabine's gull, Xema sabini (A)
- Bonaparte's gull, Chroicocephalus philadelphia
- Black-headed gull, Chroicocephalus ridibundus (A)
- Little gull, Hydrocoleus minutus (A)
- Laughing gull, Leucophaeus atricilla
- Franklin's gull, Leucophaeus pipixcan
- Short-billed gull, Larus brachyrhynchus (A)
- Ring-billed gull, Larus delawarensis
- Western gull, Larus occidentalis (A)
- California gull, Larus californicus (A)
- Herring gull, Larus argentatus
- Iceland gull, Larus glaucoides (A)
- Lesser black-backed gull, Larus fuscus
- Glaucous gull, Larus hyperboreus (A)
- Great black-backed gull, Larus marinus (A)
- Kelp gull, Larus dominicanus (A)
- Brown noddy, Anous stolidus (A)
- Sooty tern, Onychoprion fuscata
- Bridled tern, Onychoprion anaethetus
- Least tern, Sternula antillarum
- Gull-billed tern, Gelochelidon nilotica
- Caspian tern, Hydroprogne caspia
- Black tern, Chlidonias niger
- Common tern, Sterna hirundo
- Arctic tern, Sterna paradisaea (A)
- Forster's tern, Sterna forsteri
- Royal tern, Thalasseus maxima
- Sandwich tern, Thalasseus sandvicensis
- Black skimmer, Rynchops niger

== Tropicbirds ==
Order: Phaethontiformes Family: Phaethontidae

Tropicbirds are slender white birds of tropical oceans with exceptionally long central tail feathers. Their long wings have black markings, as does the head.

- Red-billed tropicbird, Phaeton aethereus (A)

== Loons ==
Order: Gaviiformes Family: Gaviidae

Loons are aquatic birds the size of a large duck, to which they are unrelated. Their plumage is largely gray or black and they have spear-shaped bills. Loons swim well and fly adequately but, because their legs are placed towards the rear of the body, are clumsy on land.

- Red-throated loon, Gavia stellata (A)
- Pacific loon, Gavia pacifica (A)
- Common loon, Gavia immer

== Albatrosses ==
Order: Procellariiformes Family: Diomedeidae

Albatrosses are among the largest of flying birds, and the great albatrosses from the genus Diomedea have the largest wingspans of any extant birds.

- Yellow-nosed albatross, Thalassarche chlororhynchos (A)

== Southern storm-petrels ==
Order: Procellariiformes Family: Oceanitidae

The storm-petrels are the smallest seabirds, relatives of the petrels, feeding on planktonic crustaceans and small fish picked from the surface, typically while hovering. The flight is fluttering and sometimes bat-like. Until 2018, this family's three species were included with the other storm-petrels in family Hydrobatidae.

- Wilson's storm-petrel, Oceanites oceanicus

== Northern storm-petrels ==
Order: Procellariiformes Family: Hydrobatidae

Though the members of this family are similar in many respects to the southern storm-petrels, including their general appearance and habits, there are enough genetic differences to warrant their placement in a separate family.

- Leach's storm-petrel, Hydrobates leucorhous (A)
- Band-rumped storm-petrel, Hydrobates castro

== Shearwaters and petrels ==
Order: Procellariiformes Family: Procellariidae

The procellariids are the main group of medium-sized "true petrels", characterized by united tubular nostrils with a median septum.

- Cory's shearwater, Calonectris diomedea (A)
- Sooty shearwater, Ardenna grisea (A)
- Great shearwater, Ardenna gravis (A)
- Manx shearwater, Puffinus puffinus (A)
- Sargasso shearwater, Puffinus lherminieri (A)

== Storks ==
Order: Ciconiiformes Family: Ciconiidae

Storks are large, heavy, long-legged, long-necked wading birds with long stout bills and wide wingspans. They lack the powder down that other wading birds such as herons, spoonbills and ibises use to clean off fish slime. Storks lack a pharynx and are mute.

- Jabiru, Jabiru mycteria (A)
- Wood stork, Mycteria americana

== Frigatebirds ==
Order: Suliformes Family: Fregatidae

Frigatebirds are large seabirds usually found over tropical oceans. They are large, black, or black-and-white, with long wings and deeply forked tails. The males have colored inflatable throat pouches. They do not swim or walk and cannot take off from a flat surface. Having the largest wingspan-to-body-weight ratio of any bird, they are essentially aerial, able to stay aloft for more than a week.

- Magnificent frigatebird, Fregata magnificens

== Boobies and gannets ==
Order: Suliformes Family: Sulidae

The sulids comprise the boobies and gannets. Both groups are medium-large coastal seabirds that plunge-dive for fish.

- Masked booby, Sula dactylatra
- Brown booby, Sula leucogaster
- Red-footed booby, Sula sula (A)
- Northern gannet, Morus bassanus

== Anhingas ==
Order: Suliformes Family: Anhingidae

Anhingas, also known as darters or snakebirds, are cormorant-like water birds with long necks and long, straight beaks. They are fish eaters, diving for long periods, and often swim with only their neck above the water, looking rather like a water snake.

- Anhinga, Anhinga anhinga

== Cormorants and shags ==
Order: Suliformes Family: Phalacrocoracidae

Cormorants are medium-to-large aquatic birds, usually with mainly dark plumage and areas of colored skin on the face. The bill is long, thin, and sharply hooked. Their feet are four-toed and webbed.

- Double-crested cormorant, Nannopterum auritum
- Neotropic cormorant, Nannopterum brasilianum

== Pelicans ==
Order: Pelecaniformes Family: Pelecanidae

Pelicans are very large water birds with a distinctive pouch under their beak. Like other birds in the order Pelecaniformes, they have four webbed toes.

- American white pelican, Pelecanus erythrorhynchos
- Brown pelican, Pelecanus occidentalis

== Herons, egrets, and bitterns ==
Order: Pelecaniformes Family: Ardeidae

The family Ardeidae contains the herons, egrets, and bitterns. Herons and egrets are wading birds with long necks and legs. Herons are large and egrets are smaller. The cattle egret is typically seen amongst flocks of cattle. Bitterns tend to be shorter necked and more secretive. Unlike other long-necked birds such as storks, ibises, and spoonbills, members of the Ardeidae fly with their necks pulled back into a curve.

- American bittern, Botaurus lentiginosus
- Least bittern, Ixobrychus exilis
- Great blue heron, Ardea herodias
- Great egret, Ardea alba
- Snowy egret, Egretta thula
- Little blue heron, Egretta caerulea
- Tricolored heron, Egretta tricolor
- Reddish egret, Egretta rufescens
- Cattle egret, Bubulcus ibis
- Green heron, Butorides virescens
- Black-crowned night-heron, Nycticorax nycticorax
- Yellow-crowned night-heron, Nyctanassa violacea

== Ibises and spoonbills ==
Order: Pelecaniformes Family: Threskiornithidae

The family Threskiornithidae includes the ibises and spoonbills. They have long, broad wings. Their bodies are elongated, the neck more so, with long legs. The bill is also long, curved downward in the ibises, straight and markedly flattened in the spoonbills.

- White ibis, Eudocimus albus
- Glossy ibis, Plegadis falcinellus
- White-faced ibis, Plegadis chihi
- Roseate spoonbill, Platalea ajaja

== New World vultures ==
Order: Cathartiformes Family: Cathartidae

New World vultures are not closely related to Old World vultures, but superficially resemble them because of convergent evolution. Like the Old World vultures, they are scavengers. Unlike Old World vultures, which find carcasses by sight, New World vultures have a good sense of smell with which they locate carcasses.

- Black vulture, Coragyps atratus
- Turkey vulture, Cathartes aura

== Osprey ==
Order: Accipitriformes Family: Pandionidae

Pandionidae is a family of fish-eating birds of prey possessing a very large, powerful hooked beak for tearing flesh from their prey, strong legs, powerful talons, and keen eyesight. The family is monotypic.

- Osprey, Pandion haliaetus

== Hawks, eagles, and kites ==
Order: Accipitriformes Family: Accipitridae

Accipitridae is a family of birds of prey that includes hawks, eagles, kites, harriers, and Old World vultures. They have very large, hooked beaks for tearing flesh from their prey, strong legs, powerful talons and keen eyesight.

- White-tailed kite, Elanus leucurus
- Swallow-tailed kite, Elanoides forficatus
- Golden eagle, Aquila chrysaetos (A)
- Northern harrier, Circus hudsonius
- Sharp-shinned hawk, Accipiter striatus
- Cooper's hawk, Accipiter cooperii
- American goshawk, Accipiter atricapillus (A)
- Bald eagle, Haliaeetus leucocephalus
- Mississippi kite, Ictinia mississippiensis
- Harris's hawk, Parabuteo unicinctus (A)
- White-tailed hawk, Geranoaetus albicaudatus (A)
- Red-shouldered hawk, Buteo lineatus
- Broad-winged hawk, Buteo platypterus
- Swainson's hawk, Buteo swainsoni
- Zone-tailed hawk, Buteo albonotatus (A)
- Red-tailed hawk, Buteo jamaicensis
- Rough-legged hawk, Buteo lagopus (A)
- Ferruginous hawk, Buteo regalis (A)

== Barn-owls ==
Order: Strigiformes Family: Tytonidae

Barn-owls are medium to large owls with large heads and characteristic heart-shaped faces. They have long strong legs with powerful talons.

- Barn owl, Tyto alba

== Owls ==
Order: Strigiformes Family: Strigidae

Typical owls are small to large solitary nocturnal birds of prey. They have large forward-facing eyes and ears, a hawk-like beak, and a conspicuous circle of feathers around each eye called a facial disk.

- Flammulated owl, Psiloscops flammeolus (A)
- Eastern screech-owl, Megascops asio
- Great horned owl, Bubo virginianus
- Snowy owl, Bubo scandiacus (A)
- Burrowing owl, Athene cunicularia (A)
- Barred owl, Strix varia
- Long-eared owl, Asio otus (A)
- Short-eared owl, Asio flammeus
- Northern saw-whet owl, Aegolius acadicus (A)

== Kingfishers ==
Order: Coraciiformes Family: Alcedinidae

Kingfishers are medium-sized birds with large heads, long pointed bills, short legs, and stubby tails.

- Ringed kingfisher, Megaceryle torquata (A)
- Belted kingfisher, Megaceryle alcyon

== Woodpeckers ==
Order: Piciformes Family: Picidae

Woodpeckers are small to medium-sized birds with chisel-like beaks, short legs, stiff tails, and long tongues used for capturing insects. Some species have feet with two toes pointing forward and two backward, while several species have only three toes. Many woodpeckers have the habit of tapping noisily on tree trunks with their beaks.

- Red-headed woodpecker, Melanerpes erythrocephalus
- Red-bellied woodpecker, Melanerpes carolinus
- Williamson's sapsucker, Sphyrapicus thyroideus (A)
- Yellow-bellied sapsucker, Sphyrapicus varius
- Red-naped sapsucker, Sphyrapicus nuchalis (A)
- Downy woodpecker, Dryobates pubescens
- Ladder-backed woodpecker, Dryobates scalaris (A)
- Red-cockaded woodpecker, Dryobates borealis
- Hairy woodpecker, Dryobates villosus
- Northern flicker, Colaptes auratus
- Pileated woodpecker, Dryocopus pileatus
- Ivory-billed woodpecker, Campephilus principalis (Noted as (E?) by the LBRC; see the species' article for the controversy surrounding it)

== Falcons and caracaras ==
Order: Falconiformes Family: Falconidae

The Falconidae is a family of diurnal birds of prey containing the falcons and caracaras. They differ from hawks, eagles, and kites in that they kill with their beaks instead of their talons.

- Crested caracara, Caracara plancus
- American kestrel, Falco sparverius
- Merlin, Falco columbarius
- Peregrine falcon, Falco peregrinus
- Prairie falcon, Falco mexicanus (A)

== New World and African parrots ==
Order: Psittaciformes Family: Psittacidae

Characteristic features of parrots include a strong curved bill, an upright stance, strong legs, and clawed zygodactyl feet. Many parrots are vividly colored, and some are multi-colored. In size they range from 8 cm (3.1 in) to 1 m (3.3 ft) in length. Most of the more than 150 species in this family are found in the New World.

- Carolina parakeet, Conuropsis carolinensis (E)

== Tyrant flycatchers ==
Order: Passeriformes Family: Tyrannidae

Tyrant flycatchers are passerines which occur throughout North and South America. They superficially resemble the Old World flycatchers, but are more robust and have stronger bills. They do not have the sophisticated vocal capabilities of the songbirds. Most, but not all, are rather plain. As the name implies, most are insectivorous.

- Dusky-capped flycatcher, Myiarchus tuberculifer (A)
- Ash-throated flycatcher, Myiarchus cinerascens
- Great crested flycatcher, Myiarchus crinitus
- Brown-crested flycatcher, Myiarchus tyrannulus (A)
- Great kiskadee, Pitangus sulphuratus
- Sulphur-bellied flycatcher, Myiodynastes luteiventris (A)
- Crowned slaty flycatcher, Empidonomus aurantioatrocristatus (A)
- Tropical kingbird, Tyrannus melancholicus (A)
- Couch's kingbird, Tyrannus couchii (A)
- Cassin's kingbird, Tyrannus vociferans (A)
- Western kingbird, Tyrannus verticalis
- Eastern kingbird, Tyrannus tyrannus
- Gray kingbird, Tyrannus dominicensis (A)
- Scissor-tailed flycatcher, Tyrannus forficatus
- Fork-tailed flycatcher, Tyrannus savana (A)
- Olive-sided flycatcher, Contopus cooperi
- Western wood-pewee, Contopus sordidulus (A)
- Eastern wood-pewee, Contopus virens
- Yellow-bellied flycatcher, Empidonax flaviventris
- Acadian flycatcher, Empidonax virescens
- Alder flycatcher, Empidonax alnorum
- Willow flycatcher, Empidonax traillii
- Least flycatcher, Empidonax minimus
- Hammond's flycatcher, Empidonax hammondii (A)
- Gray flycatcher, Empidonax wrightii (A)
- Western flycatcher, Empidonax difficilis (A)
- Eastern phoebe, Sayornis phoebe
- Say's phoebe, Sayornis saya
- Vermilion flycatcher, Pyrocephalus rubinus

== Vireos, shrike-babblers, and erpornis ==
Order: Passeriformes Family: Vireonidae

The vireos are a group of small to medium-sized passerines. They are typically greenish in color and resemble wood warblers apart from their heavier bills.

- Black-capped vireo, Vireo atricapilla (A)
- White-eyed vireo, Vireo griseus
- Bell's vireo, Vireo bellii
- Yellow-throated vireo, Vireo flavifrons
- Cassin's vireo, Vireo cassinii (A)
- Blue-headed vireo, Vireo solitarius
- Plumbeous vireo, Vireo plumbeus (A)
- Philadelphia vireo, Vireo philadelphicus
- Warbling vireo, Vireo gilvus
- Red-eyed vireo, Vireo olivaceus
- Yellow-green vireo, Vireo flavoviridis (A)
- Black-whiskered vireo, Vireo altiloquus (A)

== Shrikes ==
Order: Passeriformes Family: Laniidae

Shrikes are passerines known for their habit of catching other birds and small animals and impaling the uneaten portions of their bodies on thorns. A shrike's beak is hooked, like that of a typical bird of prey.

- Loggerhead shrike, Lanius ludovicianus

== Crows, jays, and magpies ==
Order: Passeriformes Family: Corvidae

The family Corvidae includes crows, ravens, jays, choughs, magpies, treepies, nutcrackers, and ground jays. Corvids are above average in size among the Passeriformes and some of the larger species show high levels of intelligence.

- Blue jay, Cyanocitta cristata
- Clark's nutcracker, Nucifraga columbiana (A)
- American crow, Corvus brachyrhynchos
- Fish crow, Corvus ossifragus
- Chihuahuan raven, Corvus cryptoleucus (A)

== Tits, chickadees, and titmice ==
Order: Passeriformes Family: Paridae

The Paridae are mainly small stocky woodland species with short stout bills. Some have crests. They are adaptable birds, with a mixed diet including seeds and insects.

- Carolina chickadee, Poecile carolinensis
- Tufted titmouse, Baeolophus bicolor

== Larks ==
Order: Passeriformes Family: Alaudidae

Larks are small terrestrial birds with often extravagant songs and display flights. Most larks are fairly dull in appearance. Their food is insects and seeds.

- Horned lark, Eremophila alpestris

== Swallows ==
Order: Passeriformes Family: Hirundinidae

The family Hirundinidae is adapted to aerial feeding. They have a slender streamlined body, long pointed wings, and a short bill with a wide gape. The feet are adapted to perching rather than walking, and the front toes are partly joined at the base.

- Bank swallow, Riparia riparia
- Tree swallow, Tachycineta bicolor
- Northern rough-winged swallow, Stelgidopteryx serripennis
- Brown-chested martin, Progne tapera (A)
- Purple martin, Progne subis
- Barn swallow, Hirundo rustica
- Cliff swallow, Petrochelidon pyrrhonota
- Cave swallow, Petrochelidon fulva

== Kinglets ==
Order: Passeriformes Family: Regulidae

The kinglets are a small family of birds which resemble the titmice. They are very small insectivorous birds. The adults have colored crowns, giving rise to their name.

- Ruby-crowned kinglet, Corthylio calendula
- Golden-crowned kinglet, Regulus satrapa

== Waxwings ==
Order: Passeriformes Family: Bombycillidae

The waxwings are a group of birds with soft silky plumage and unique red tips to some of the wing feathers. In the Bohemian and cedar waxwings, these tips look like sealing wax and give the group its name. These are arboreal birds of northern forests. They live on insects in summer and berries in winter.

- Cedar waxwing, Bombycilla cedrorum

== Nuthatches ==
Order: Passeriformes Family: Sittidae

Nuthatches are small woodland birds. They have the unusual ability to climb down trees head first, unlike most other birds which can only go upwards. Nuthatches have big heads, short tails, and powerful bills and feet.

- Red-breasted nuthatch, Sitta canadensis
- White-breasted nuthatch, Sitta carolinensis
- Brown-headed nuthatch, Sitta pusilla

== Treecreepers ==
Order: Passeriformes Family: Certhiidae

Treecreepers are small woodland birds, brown above and white below. They have thin pointed down-curved bills, which they use to extricate insects from bark. They have stiff tail feathers, like woodpeckers, which they use to support themselves on vertical trees.

- Brown creeper, Certhia americana

== Gnatcatchers ==
Order: Passeriformes Family: Polioptilidae

The family Polioptilidae is a group of small insectivorous passerine birds containing the gnatcatchers and gnatwrens.

- Blue-gray gnatcatcher, Polioptila caerulea

== Wrens ==
Order: Passeriformes Family: Troglodytidae

Wrens are small and inconspicuous birds, except for their loud songs. They have short wings and thin down-turned bills. Several species often hold their tails upright. All are insectivorous.

- Rock wren, Salpinctes obsoletus (A)
- House wren, Troglodytes aedon
- Winter wren, Troglodytes hyemalis
- Sedge wren, Cistothorus platensis
- Marsh wren, Cistothorus palustris
- Carolina wren, Thryothorus ludovicianus
- Bewick's wren, Thryomanes bewickii

== Mockingbirds and thrashers ==
Order: Passeriformes Family: Mimidae

The mimids are a family of passerine birds which includes thrashers, mockingbirds, tremblers, and the New World catbirds. They are notable for their vocalization, especially their remarkable ability to mimic a wide variety of birds and other sounds heard outdoors. The species tend towards dull grays and browns in their appearance.

- Gray catbird, Dumetella carolinensis
- Curve-billed thrasher, Toxostoma curvirostre (A)
- Brown thrasher, Toxostoma rufum
- Sage thrasher, Oreoscoptes montanus (A)
- Northern mockingbird, Mimus polyglottos

== Starlings ==
Order: Passeriformes Family: Sturnidae

Starlings are small to medium-sized passerines with strong feet. Their flight is strong and direct and they are very gregarious. Their preferred habitat is open country, and they eat insects and fruit. Their plumage is typically dark with a metallic sheen.

- European starling, Sturnus vulgaris (I)

== Thrushes and allies ==
Order: Passeriformes Family: Turdidae

The thrushes are a group of passerine birds that occur mainly but not exclusively in the Old World. They are plump, soft plumaged, small to medium-sized insectivores or sometimes omnivores, often feeding on the ground. Many have attractive songs.

- Eastern bluebird, Sialia sialis
- Mountain bluebird, Sialia currucoides (A)
- Townsend's solitaire, Myadestes townsendi (A)
- Veery, Catharus fuscescens
- Gray-cheeked thrush, Catharus minimus
- Swainson's thrush, Catharus ustulatus
- Hermit thrush, Catharus guttatus
- Wood thrush, Hylocichla mustelina
- American robin, Turdus migratorius
- Varied thrush, Ixoreus naevius (A)

== Old World flycatchers ==
Order: Passeriformes Family: Muscicapidae

The Old World flycatchers form a large family of small passerine birds. These are mainly small arboreal insectivores, many of which, as the name implies, take their prey on the wing.

- Northern wheatear, Oenanthe oenanthe (A)

== Old World sparrows ==
Order: Passeriformes Family: Passeridae

Old World sparrows are small passerine birds. In general, sparrows tend to be small plump brownish or grayish birds with short tails and short powerful beaks. Sparrows are seed eaters, but they also consume small insects.

- House sparrow, Passer domesticus (I)

== Wagtails and pipits ==
Order: Passeriformes Family: Motacillidae

Motacillidae is a family of small passerine birds with medium to long tails. They include the wagtails, longclaws, and pipits. They are slender ground-feeding insectivores of open country.

- White wagtail, Motacilla alba (A)
- American pipit, Anthus rubescens
- Sprague's pipit, Anthus spragueii

== Finches, euphonias, and allies ==
Order: Passeriformes Family: Fringillidae

Finches are seed-eating passerines. They are small to moderately large and have strong, usually conical and sometimes very large, beaks. All have twelve tail feathers and nine primaries. They have a bouncing flight with alternating bouts of flapping and gliding on closed wings, and most sing well.

- Evening grosbeak, Coccothraustes vespertinus (A)
- House finch, Haemorhous mexicanus (Native to the southwestern U.S.; introduced in the east)
- Cassin's finch, Haemorhous cassinii (A)
- Purple finch, Haemorhous purpureus
- Red crossbill, Loxia curvirostra (A)
- Pine siskin, Spinus pinus
- Lesser goldfinch, Spinus psaltria (A)
- American goldfinch, Spinus tristis

== Longspurs and snow buntings ==
Order: Passeriformes Family: Calcariidae

The Calcariidae are a group of passerine birds that were traditionally grouped with the New World sparrows, but differ in a number of respects and are usually found in open grassy areas.

- Lapland longspur, Calcarius lapponicus
- Chestnut-collared longspur, Calcarius ornatus (A)
- Smith's longspur, Calcarius pictus (A)
- Thick-billed longspur, Rhynchophanes mccownii (A)

== New World sparrows ==
Order: Passeriformes Family: Passerellidae

Until 2017, these species were considered part of the family Emberizidae. Most of the species are known as sparrows, but these birds are not closely related to the Old World sparrows which are in the family Passeridae. Many of these have distinctive head patterns.

- Cassin's sparrow, Peucaea cassinii (A)
- Bachman's sparrow, Peucaea aestivalis
- Grasshopper sparrow, Ammodramus savannarum
- Lark sparrow, Chondestes grammacus
- Lark bunting, Calamospiza melanocorys (A)
- Chipping sparrow, Spizella passerina
- Clay-colored sparrow, Spizella pallida
- Field sparrow, Spizella pusilla
- Brewer's sparrow, Spizella breweri (A)
- Fox sparrow, Passerella iliaca
- American tree sparrow, Spizelloides arborea (A)
- Dark-eyed junco, Junco hyemalis
- White-crowned sparrow, Zonotrichia leucophrys
- Golden-crowned sparrow, Zonotrichia atricapilla (A)
- Harris's sparrow, Zonotrichia querula
- White-throated sparrow, Zonotrichia albicollis
- Vesper sparrow, Pooecetes gramineus
- LeConte's sparrow, Ammospiza leconteii
- Seaside sparrow, Ammospiza maritima
- Nelson's sparrow, Ammospiza nelsoni
- Baird's sparrow, Centronyx bairdii (A)
- Henslow's sparrow, Centronyx henslowii
- Savannah sparrow, Passerculus sandwichensis
- Song sparrow, Melospiza melodia
- Lincoln's sparrow, Melospiza lincolnii
- Swamp sparrow, Melospiza georgiana
- Green-tailed towhee, Pipilo chlorurus (A)
- Spotted towhee, Pipilo maculatus (A)
- Eastern towhee, Pipilo erythrophthalmus

== Yellow-breasted chat ==
Order: Passeriformes Family: Icteriidae

This species was historically placed in the wood-warblers (Parulidae) but nonetheless most authorities were unsure if it belonged there. It was placed in its own family in 2017.

- Yellow-breasted chat, Icteria virens

== Troupials and allies ==
Order: Passeriformes Family: Icteridae

The icterids are a group of small to medium-sized, often colorful, passerines restricted to the New World, including the grackles, New World blackbirds, and New World orioles. Most have black as a predominant plumage color, often enlivened by yellow, orange, or red.

- Yellow-headed blackbird, Xanthocephalus xanthocephalus
- Bobolink, Dolichonyx oryzivorus
- Eastern meadowlark, Sturnella magna
- Western meadowlark, Sturnella neglecta
- Orchard oriole, Icterus spurius
- Hooded oriole, Icterus cucullatus (A)
- Bullock's oriole, Icterus bullockii (A)
- Baltimore oriole, Icterus galbula
- Scott's oriole, Icterus parisorum (A)
- Red-winged blackbird, Agelaius phoeniceus
- Shiny cowbird, Molothrus bonariensis (A)
- Bronzed cowbird, Molothrus aeneus
- Brown-headed cowbird, Molothrus ater
- Rusty blackbird, Euphagus carolinus
- Brewer's blackbird, Euphagus cyanocephalus
- Common grackle, Quiscalus quiscula
- Boat-tailed grackle, Quiscalus major
- Great-tailed grackle, Quiscalus mexicanus

== New World warblers ==
Order: Passeriformes Family: Parulidae

The wood-warblers are a group of small, often colorful, passerines restricted to the New World. Most are arboreal, but some are terrestrial. Most members of this family are insectivores.

- Ovenbird, Seiurus aurocapilla
- Worm-eating warbler, Helmitheros vermivorus
- Louisiana waterthrush, Parkesia motacilla
- Northern waterthrush, Parkesia noveboracensis
- Bachman's warbler, Vermivora bachmanii (Probably extinct)
- Golden-winged warbler, Vermivora chrysoptera
- Blue-winged warbler, Vermivora cyanoptera
- Black-and-white warbler, Mniotilta varia
- Prothonotary warbler, Protonotaria citrea
- Swainson's warbler, Limnothlypis swainsonii
- Tennessee warbler, Leiothlypis peregrina
- Orange-crowned warbler, Leiothlypis celata
- Lucy's warbler, Leiothlypis luciae (A)
- Nashville warbler, Leiothlypis ruficapilla
- Virginia's warbler, Leiothlypis virginiae (A)
- Connecticut warbler, Oporornis agilis (A)
- MacGillivray's warbler, Geothlypis tolmiei (A)
- Mourning warbler, Geothlypis philadelphia
- Kentucky warbler, Geothlypis formosa
- Common yellowthroat, Geothlypis trichas
- Hooded warbler, Setophaga citrina
- American redstart, Setophaga ruticilla
- Cape May warbler, Setophaga tigrina
- Cerulean warbler, Setophaga cerulea
- Northern parula, Setophaga americana
- Tropical parula, Setophaga pitiayumi (A)
- Magnolia warbler, Setophaga magnolia
- Bay-breasted warbler, Setophaga castanea
- Blackburnian warbler, Setophaga fusca
- Yellow warbler, Setophaga petechia
- Chestnut-sided warbler, Setophaga pensylvanica
- Blackpoll warbler, Setophaga striata
- Black-throated blue warbler, Setophaga caerulescens
- Palm warbler, Setophaga palmarum
- Pine warbler, Setophaga pinus
- Yellow-rumped warbler, Setophaga coronata
- Yellow-throated warbler, Setophaga dominica
- Prairie warbler, Setophaga discolor
- Black-throated gray warbler, Setophaga nigrescens (A)
- Townsend's warbler, Setophaga townsendi (A)
- Hermit warbler, Setophaga occidentalis (A)
- Black-throated green warbler, Setophaga virens
- Canada warbler, Cardellina canadensis
- Wilson's warbler, Cardellina pusilla
- Red-faced warbler, Cardellina rubrifrons (A)
- Painted redstart, Myioborus pictus (A)

== Cardinals and allies ==
Order: Passeriformes Family: Cardinalidae

The cardinals are a family of robust, seed-eating birds with strong bills. They are typically associated with open woodland. The sexes usually have distinct plumages.

- Hepatic tanager, Piranga flava (A)
- Summer tanager, Piranga rubra
- Scarlet tanager, Piranga olivacea
- Western tanager, Piranga ludoviciana
- Northern cardinal, Cardinalis cardinalis
- Pyrrhuloxia, Cardinalis sinuatus (A)
- Rose-breasted grosbeak, Pheucticus ludovicianus
- Black-headed grosbeak, Pheucticus melanocephalus (A)
- Blue bunting, Cyanocompsa parellina (A)
- Blue grosbeak, Passerina caerulea
- Lazuli bunting, Passerina amoena (A)
- Indigo bunting, Passerina cyanea
- Varied bunting, Passerina versicolor (A)
- Painted bunting, Passerina ciris
- Dickcissel, Spiza americana

== Tanagers and allies ==
Order: Passeriformes Family: Thraupidae

The tanagers are a large group of small to medium-sized passerine birds restricted to the New World, mainly in the tropics. Many species are brightly colored. As a family they are omnivorous, but individual species specialize in eating fruits, seeds, insects, or other types of food. Most have short, rounded wings.

- Red-legged honeycreeper, Cyanerpes cyaneus (A)

== See also ==
- List of North American birds
