= Red warbler =

Conservation status
- Least Concern (IUCN 3.1)

Scientific classification
- Kingdom: Animalia
- Phylum: Chordata
- Class: Aves
- Order: Passeriformes
- Family: Parulidae
- Genus: Cardellina
- Species: C. rubra

Binomial name
- Cardellina rubra (Swainson, 1827)
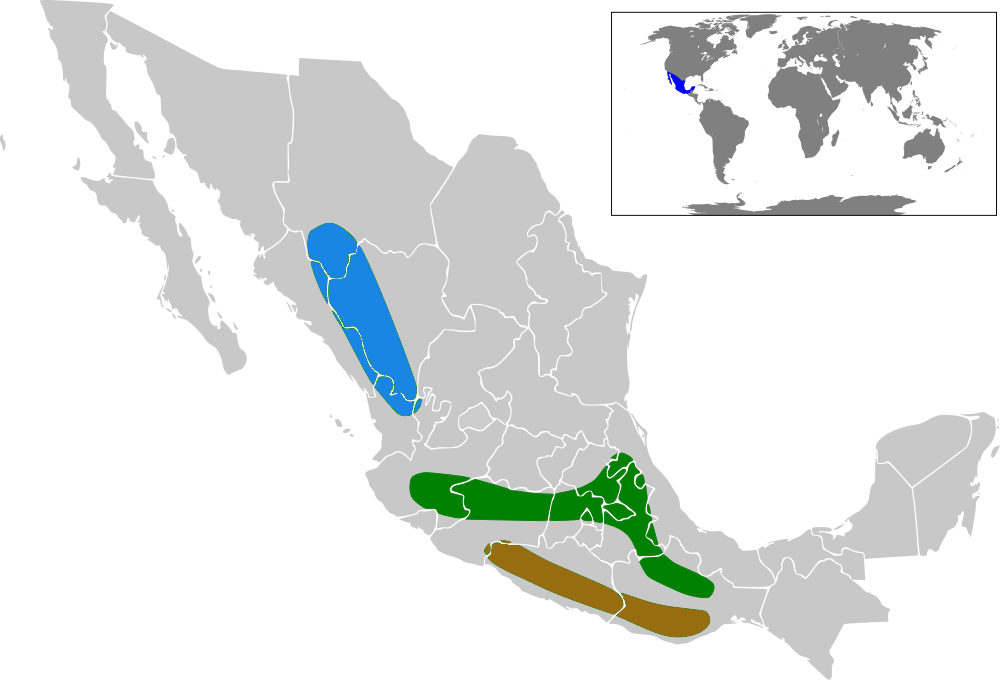
- Range of the red warbler Blue = ssp. melanauris green = ssp. rubra brown = ssp. rowleyi

Synonyms
- Setophaga ruber Swainson, 1827; Sylvia miniata Lafresnaye, 1836; Parus leucotis Giraud, 1841; Basileuterus ruber Cabanis, 1850; Ergaticus ruber Sclater and Salvin, 1873

Species of bird

The red warbler (Cardellina rubra) is a small passerine bird of the New World warbler family Parulidae endemic to the highlands of Mexico, north of the Isthmus of Tehuantepec. It is closely related to, and forms a superspecies with, the pink-headed warbler of southern Mexico and Guatemala. There are three subspecies, found in disjunct populations, which differ in the color of their ear patch and in the brightness and tone of their body plumage. The adult is bright red, with a white or gray ear patch, depending on the subspecies; young birds are pinkish-brown, with a whitish ear patch and two pale wingbars.

Breeding typically occurs between February and May. The female lays three or four eggs in a domed nest, which she builds on the ground. Though she alone incubates the eggs, both sexes feed the young and remove fecal sacs from the nest. The young fledge within 10–11 days of hatching. The red warbler is an insectivore, gleaning primarily in understory shrubs. Although this bird is considered to be a least-concern species according to the International Union for Conservation of Nature (IUCN), its numbers are thought to be declining due to habitat destruction.

== Taxonomy ==
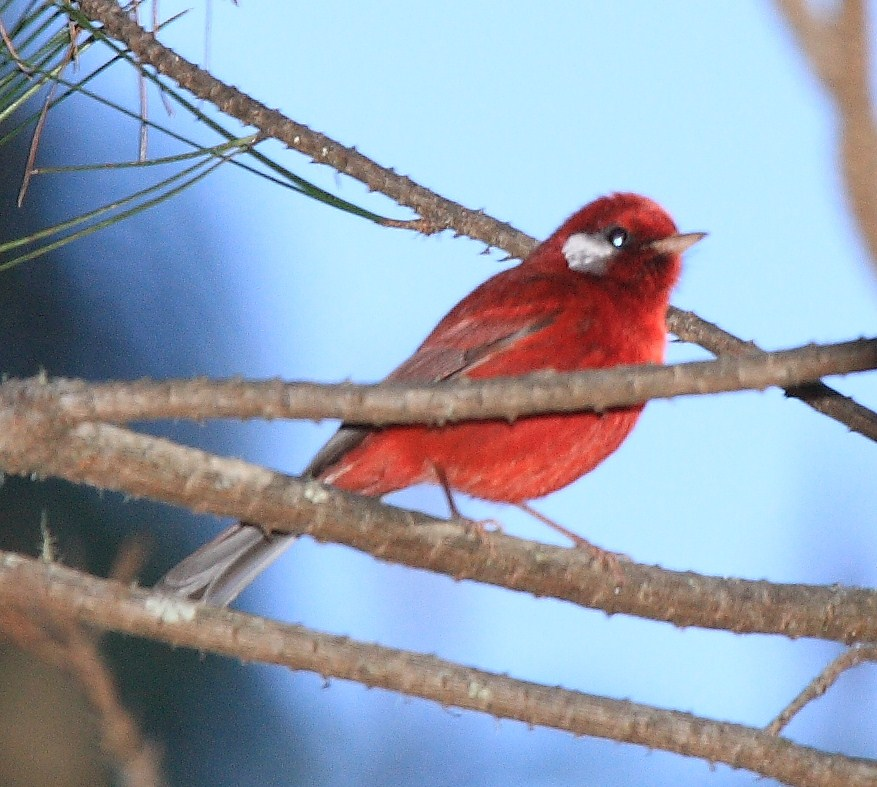
The subspecies C. r. rubra has a white, rather than gray, ear patch.

English jeweler and naturalist William Bullock and his son traveled to Mexico soon after its independence, spending six months in 1823 collecting archaeological artifacts and many bird and fish species new to science. The bird specimens were given to naturalist William Swainson, their countryman, to formally describe, which he did in 1827. Among these was the red warbler, which was assigned to the genus Setophaga, as Setophaga rubra. Over the next half century, other authorities moved it to Cardellina, with the red-faced warbler, and to the widespread tropical warbler genus Basileuterus, as well as to the Old World warbler genus Sylvia and the Old World tit genus Parus. In 1873, English naturalists Philip Lutley Sclater and Osbert Salvin moved the species to the genus Ergaticus, where it remained for more than a century.

The red warbler forms a superspecies with the pink-headed warbler of Chiapas and Guatemala. Despite their disjunct ranges and considerably different plumages, the two have sometimes been considered conspecific. Conversely, it has also been suggested that the red warbler should be split into a northern gray-eared species (C. melanauris) and a southern white-eared species (C. rubra). A comprehensive 2010 paper by Irby Lovette and colleagues analyzing mitochondrial and nuclear DNA of the New World warblers found that the red and pink-headed warblers are each other's closest relative and that their common ancestor diverged from a lineage that gave rise to the red-faced warbler. The authors recommended moving the red and pink-headed warblers to the genus Cardellina, a suggestion which has been adopted by the International Ornithologists' Union (IOC).

There are three subspecies, which differ slightly in appearance:

- C. r. rubra, described by Swainson in 1827, has white ear patches and is found from southern Jalisco and southern Hidalgo to Oaxaca.
- C. r. melanauris, originally described and named by American ornithologist Robert Thomas Moore in 1937 as Ergaticus ruber melanauris, has dark gray ear patches and somewhat more scarlet upperparts than C. r. rubra. The subspecific name is derived from the Ancient Greek melan- "black/dark", and Latin auris "ear". It is found from southwestern Chihuahua to northern Nayarit.
- C. r. rowleyi was originally described and named by R. T. Orr and J. D. Webster in 1968 as Ergaticus ruber rowleyi, in honor of J. Stewart Rowley, a research associate at the California Academy of Sciences. It has white ear patches and ruby-red upperparts (brightest of the three subspecies), and is found in the Sierra Madre del Sur mountains, from Guerrero to southern Oaxaca.

"Red warbler" has been designated the official name by the IOC. It is a straightforward reference to its color. The genus name Cardellina is the diminutive of the Italian cardella, a regional name for the European goldfinch, while its specific name, rubra, is Latin for "red".

== Description ==
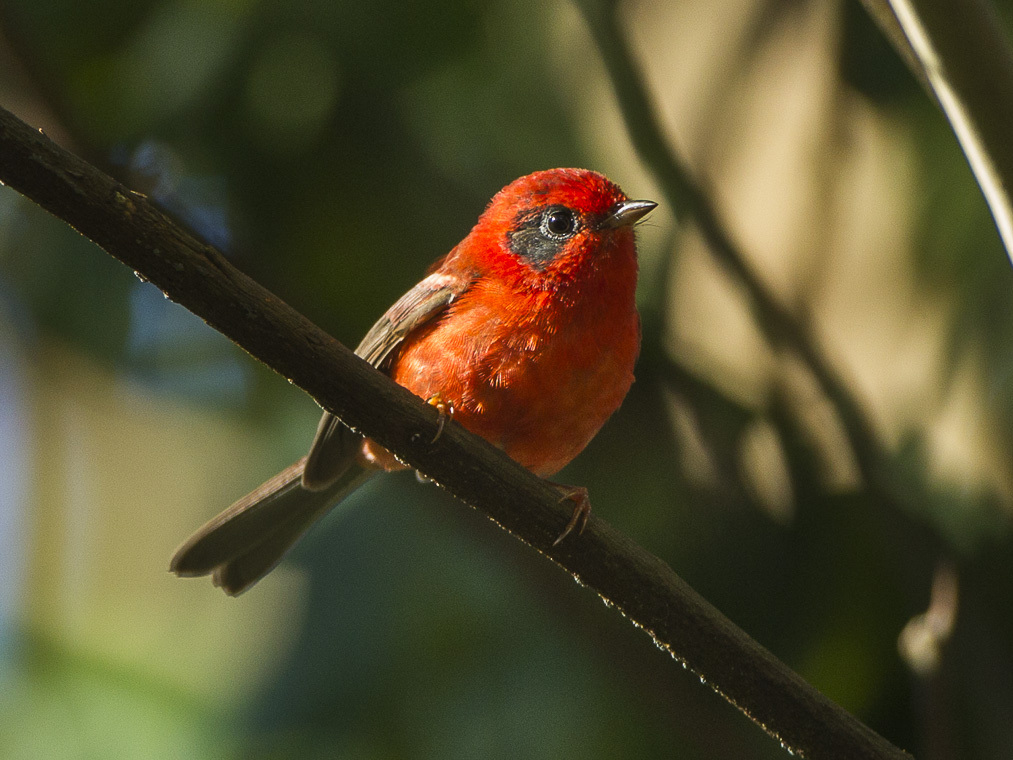
Cardellina rubra melanauris Sinaloa, Mexico

The red warbler is a small passerine, measuring 12.5–13.5 cm (4.9–5.3 in) in length, (Note: By convention, length is measured from the tip of the bill to the tip of the tail on a dead bird (or skin) laid on its back.) and weighing from 7.6 to 8.7 g (0.27 to 0.31 oz). As an adult, it is red overall, with either a white or dark gray (depending on the subspecies) auricular patch on each side of its head. Its wings and tail are slightly darker, dusky red, and edged in pinkish-red. Its legs are a dull red-brown, and its thin bill is pinkish-gray with a dark tip. The iris is dark brown to blackish. Plumage varies little between the sexes, although the female tends to be a little duller or more orange-tinged. Adult pairs separate and molt fully from August, after the breeding season.

The adult red warbler is hard to confuse with any other bird species in its range; the scarlet tanager and summer tanager have similar mostly-red plumage but are larger with thick conical bills.

As a juvenile, the red warbler is pinkish-brown with a whitish auricular patch. Its darker wings and tail show pinkish-cinnamon edges, with two paler wingbars on the former.

=== Voice ===
The red warbler has several common calls, including a high, thin tsii and a stronger pseet. Its song is a mix of short trills and richer warbles, interspersed with high-pitched chips. Unlike other species in the same habitat zone, it tends to sing only during bright morning hours during the breeding season. It does not sing – and even its calling frequency decreases – in cloudy weather, regardless of season.

== Distribution and habitat ==
Endemic to the highlands of Mexico north of the Isthmus of Tehuantepec, the red warbler has three disjunct populations that correspond to the three subspecies: from southwestern Chihuahua to northern Nayarit, from southern Jalisco and southern Hidalgo to Oaxaca, and from Guerrero into southern Oaxaca in the Sierra Madre del Sur mountains. It is fairly common to common in the country's interior and on adjacent slopes, where it occurs at elevations ranging from 1,800 to 3,900 metres (5,900 to 12,800 ft) above sea level; it does not occur along either coast. It is an altitudinal migrant, moving from higher humid or semi-humid pine, pine-oak and fir forests in the breeding season to lower elevations, often in oak forests, in the winter. It is among the most common of the small birds in its woodland habitat, second only to the golden-crowned kinglet in fir forests in one study and the third most common warbler in oak-conifer woodlands in another.

Though the species was reported to have been collected in Texas in the late 19th century, the record's location was not widely believed, and there is no strong evidence that it ever occurred there. It has strayed as far north as southeastern Arizona, where a bird was found on Mount Lemmon in 2018.

== Behavior ==
Though it occasionally joins mixed-species flocks, the red warbler is more typically found alone or in pairs. Youngsters probably choose mates in the autumn of their first year, and pairs remain together year-round, except during severe weather and during post-breeding molt.

=== Breeding ===
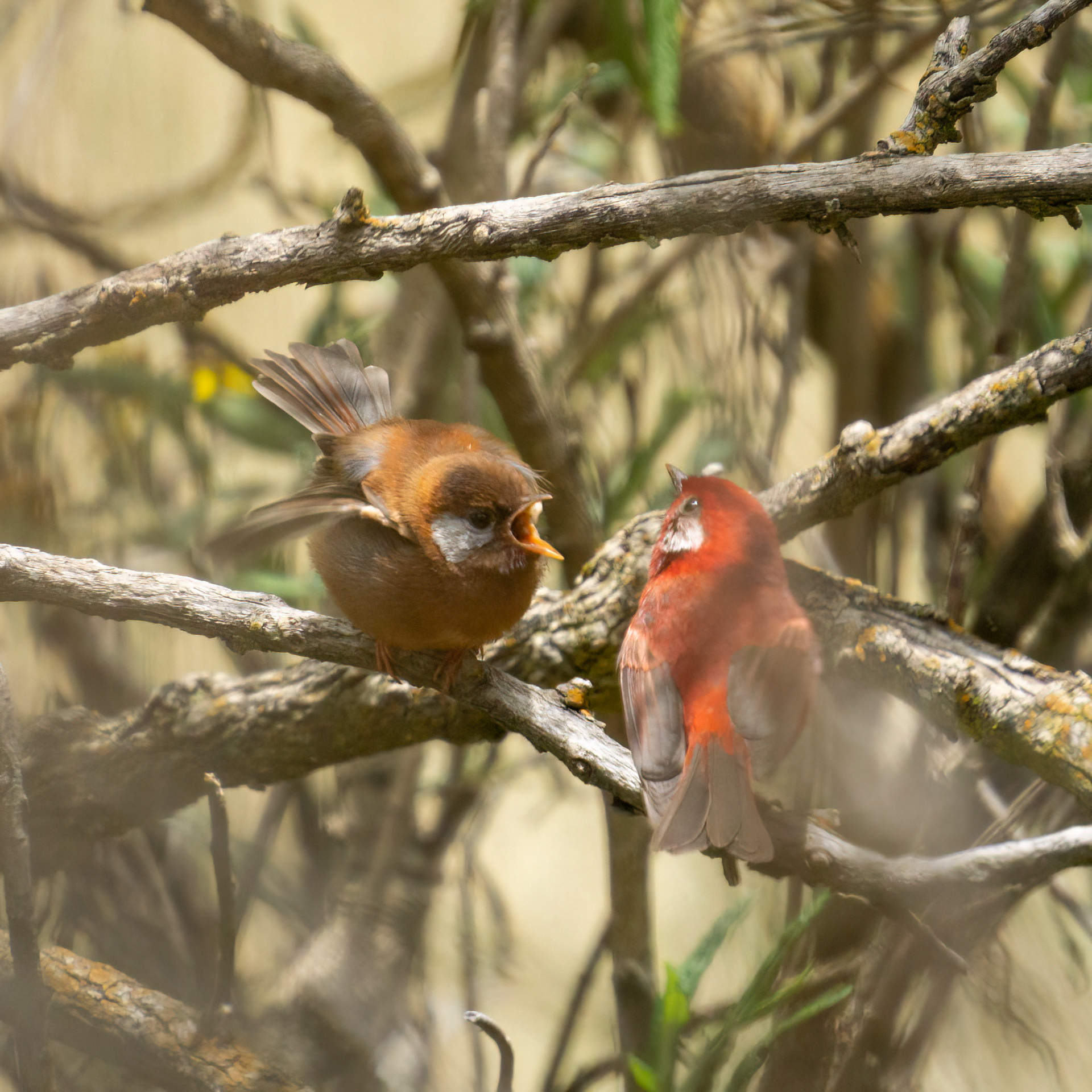
A Red Warbler feeding its young in Mexico

The red warbler breeds primarily in early spring, from February until May, though at least one nest containing young has been found as late as the end of June. By late February, the male establishes a territory that averages about 40 square metres, defending it with song. Other males may intrude by silently flying in at a height of around 3 m (10 ft) and back to their own territory. Deep incursions result in combat, after which the interloper usually leaves. Beginning in mid-March, the male courts the female by chasing her through the undergrowth. The pair then perch together while the male sings and the female calls softly. The female alone builds the nest, a task which typically takes 4–6 days. She chooses a sunlit area, such as an area of windfall, the brushy edge of a trail or water course, or a small clearing, for its location. Tightly woven of plant material, the nest is hidden in ground vegetation and anchored to the stalks of surrounding vegetation. The nest, which is usually oven-shaped with a side or upward-facing entrance, measures roughly 15 cm (6 in) wide by 18 cm (7 in) long by 11 cm (4.5 in) high. Bulky and untidy on the outside, it is typically constructed primarily of dead pine needles and dead grass, though gray lichens, green moss, dead leaves, shreds of bark and tips of fern fronds are also used; most of these materials are gathered from the ground close to the nest, though some is picked from low branches or further away. A few nests are only cups, lacking the roof of the more typical structures. Inside, the nest is tidy and compact, lined with fine grasses and plant fluff, which is generally gathered some distance from the nest.

Early in the breeding season, there may be a gap of as many as 11 days between the completion of the nest and the laying of the first egg. Later in the season, this time decreases so that the first egg is laid as soon as the nest is ready. The female normally lays three eggs, though clutches of up to four have been recorded. The eggs, which are variously described as pale pink with evenly distributed brown spots or white with cinnamon and rust spots densely ringing the larger end of the egg, measure 16–17 mm (0.63–0.67 in) by 13 mm (0.51 in) and weigh 1–1.4 g (0.035–0.049 oz). The female alone incubates the eggs for 16 days; the male does not even approach the nest until several days after the eggs hatch. She sits facing the back wall of the nest, with her head and body sheltered by its roof and her tail sticking out the opening. She sits tight at the approach of danger, typically not flying until a potential predator actually makes contact with the nest.

Both adults feed the nestlings and remove fecal sacs, though the female removes far more than the male does. The parents move deceptively when approaching the nest, foraging – or pretending to forage – in nearby vegetation. They stay only a few seconds in any one spot, including at the nest, making it more difficult for a predator to locate the young. Nestlings make a rapid, high-pitched peeping call as an adult approaches carrying food. They fledge within 10–11 days of hatching. Young birds are fully grown three weeks after fledging, upon which time they are driven off by their parents.

=== Food and feeding ===
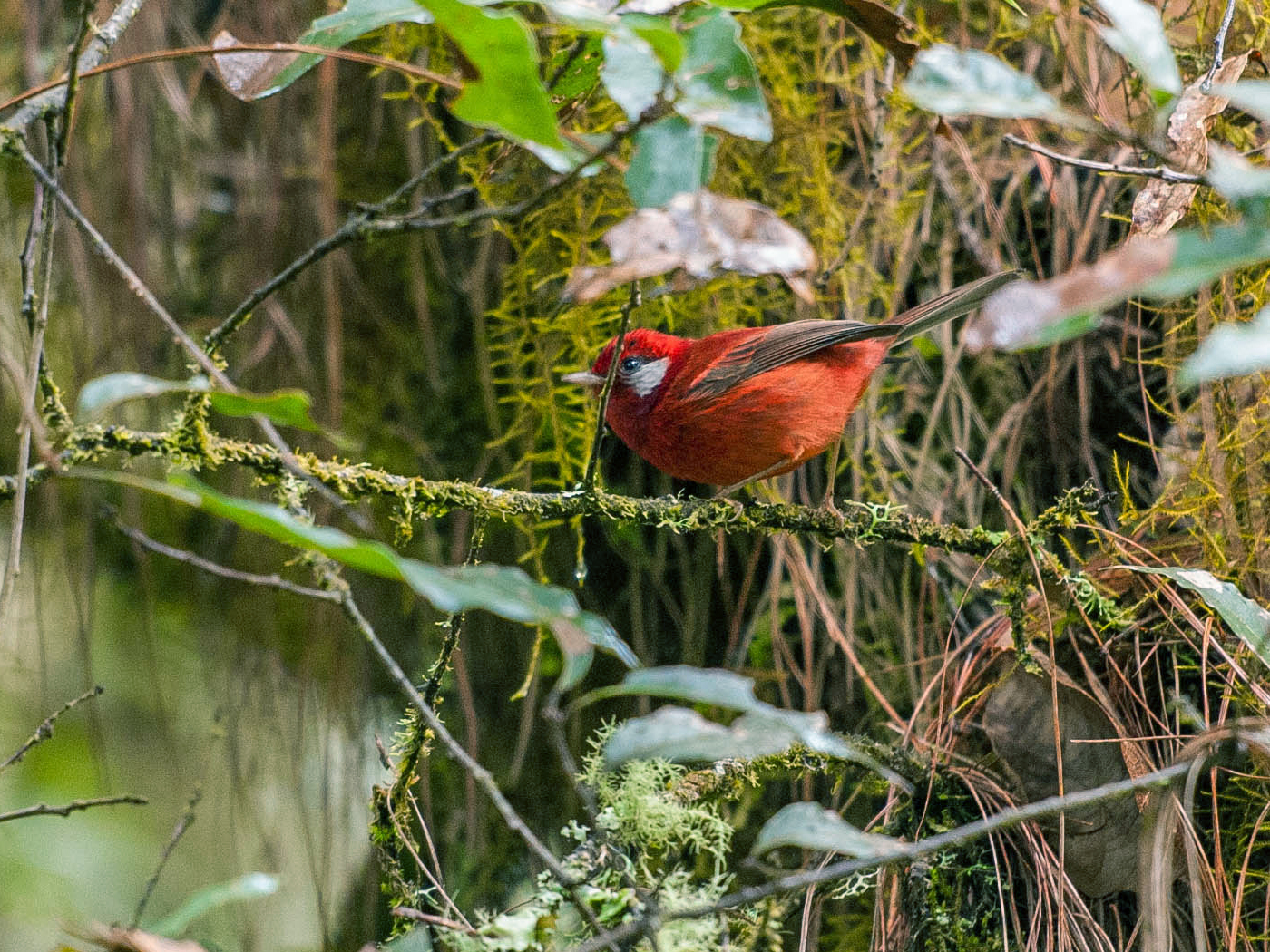
A red warbler in typical habitat

The red warbler is an insectivore. It gleans primarily in understory shrubs at low to middle levels, moving slowly and deliberately through more open areas of the vegetation, and feeding with quick jabs into cracks in bark and pine needle clusters. It sometimes hovers briefly to feed at pine needle clusters, a foraging technique known as "hover gleaning". Though it lacks any obvious adaptations for climbing, it regularly does so in its search for prey items on bark and epiphytes on branches, often hanging head-down as it probes. In areas of deciduous growth, it typically flycatches, making brief aerial sorties from a perch in pursuit of flying insects. While it seldom associates with mixed-species flocks, it often feeds alongside other birds with no signs of conflict, displaying no hostility towards other species—such as the slate-throated whitestart (Myioborus miniatus)—with which it competes. It has been observed chasing off a flycatcher of the genus Empidonax. Its foraging area is quite small, often amounting to only a few dozen square meters (several hundred square feet) per day. Late in the afternoon, its rate of foraging declines, and it rests, often taking brief naps, in the forest understory. Though it does not generally feed after sunset, it may do so to take advantage of transient food sources, such as hatching Neuroptera.

=== Parasitism and predation ===
The red warbler is presumably hunted by small hawks such as the sharp-shinned hawk, and its nest raided by wrens, rodents, raccoons, feral cats and snakes. Isospora cardellinae is a protozoan species that has been isolated from a red warbler from Nevado de Toluca National Park, Mexico. It is a parasite that lives in cells in the villi of the bird's small intestine.

=== Toxicity ===
In the 16th century, Friar Bernardino de Sahagún had reported that a red bird matching the description of the red warbler was regarded as inedible by the Aztecs. Researchers Patricia Escalante and John W. Daly isolated two alkaloids in preliminary investigations of the feathers. The presence of these alkaloids render the bird unpalatable; humans find it inedible.

== Conservation and threats ==
The red warbler is currently rated as a species of least concern by the International Union for Conservation of Nature. Though there is evidence that its numbers are decreasing, the decline has not been precipitous (that is, less than a 30% decline over ten years or three generations), and the population remains quite large, estimates ranging from 50,000 to 499,999 birds. The forested areas in which it occurs include some of the most threatened habitats in Mexico; logging, agricultural expansion, firewood gathering, road building, tourist development, overgrazing and intensive urbanization are among the many things contributing to the destruction of the forests. There is some evidence that selective logging in pine forests may actually favor this species, which prefers more open, sunlit areas in which to breed.
