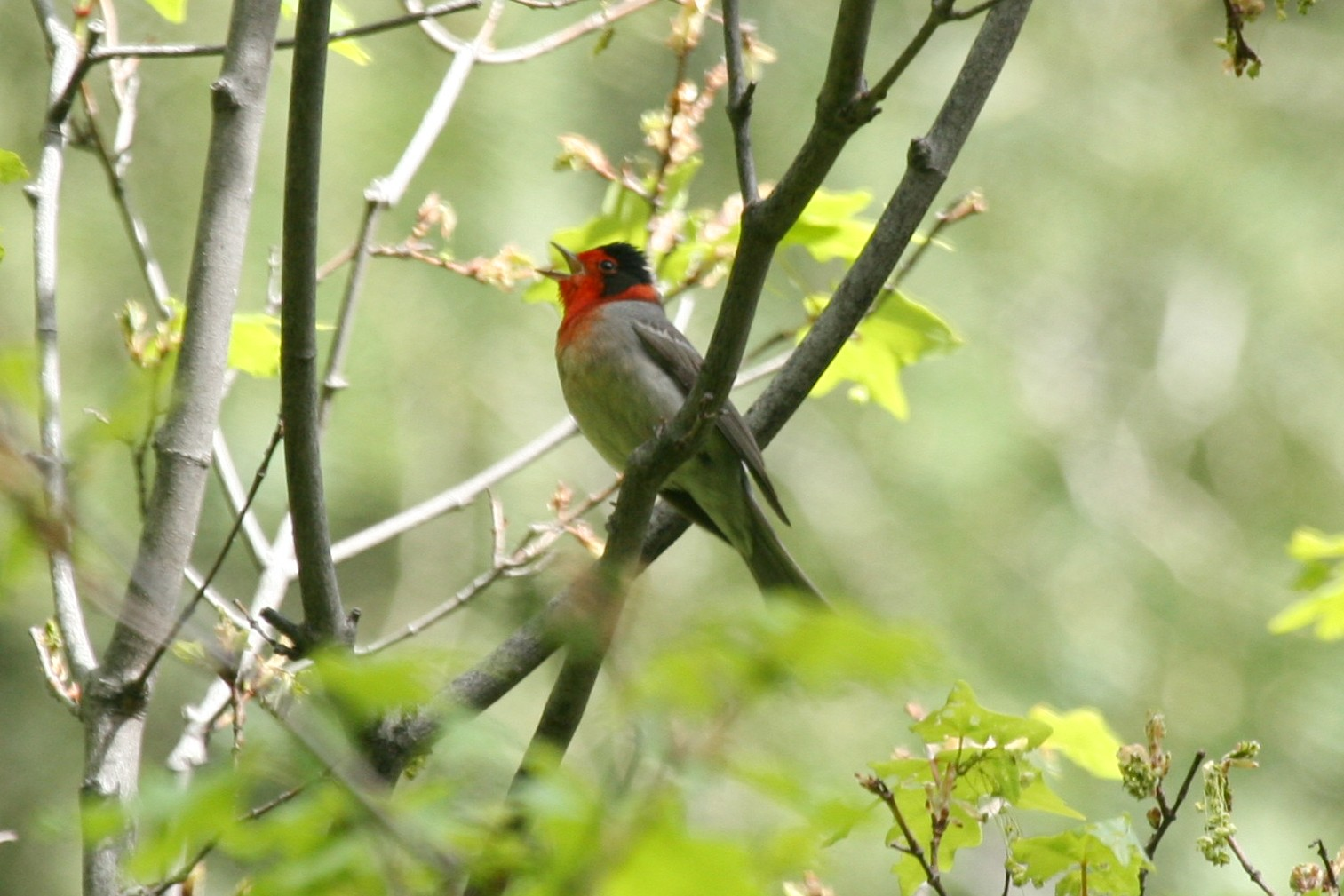
- Red-faced warbler (Cardellina rubifrons)

Scientific classification
- Kingdom: Animalia
- Phylum: Chordata
- Class: Aves
- Order: Passeriformes
- Family: Parulidae
- Genus: Cardellina; Bonaparte, 1850

Type species
- Cardinella amicta= Muscicapa rubrifrons Du Bus de Gisignies

Species
- See text

Synonyms
- Ergaticus Baird (1865)

= Cardellina =

Genus of birds

Cardellina is a genus of passerine birds in the New World warbler family Parulidae. The genus name Cardellina is a diminutive of the Italian dialect word Cardella for the European goldfinch.

== Taxonomy ==
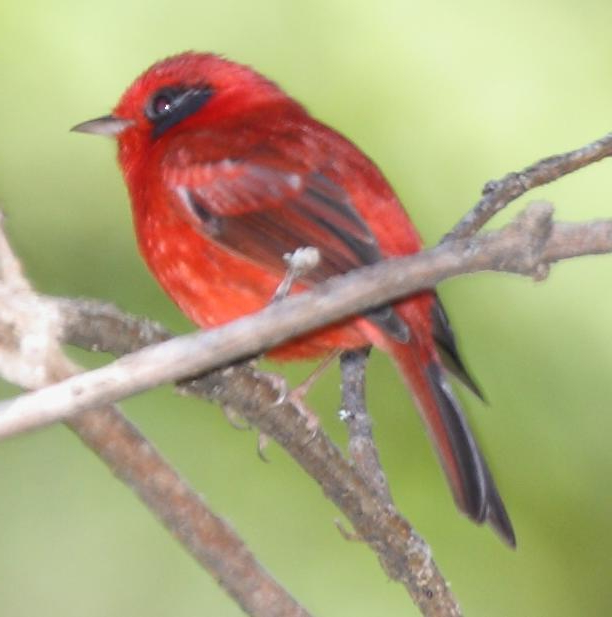
Red warbler

The genus was introduced by the French naturalist Charles Lucien Bonaparte in 1850. The type species was fixed in 1865 by the American naturalist Spencer Baird as Muscicapa rubrifrons Giraud, 1841, the red-faced warbler. The genus originally contained one species, the red-faced warbler. A comprehensive study of the wood-warblers published in 2010 that analysed mitochondrial and nuclear DNA sequences found that the five species formed a discrete clade, with the Wilson's and Canada warblers as early offshoots, followed by a lineage that gave rise to two branches – one leading to the red-faced and another that diverged to the red and pink-headed warblers.

Spencer Fullerton Baird described the genus Ergaticus in 1865, using it to separate several species from what he felt was the closely related genus Cardellina, and eventually subsumed into Cardellina in 2011. Prior to the creation and widespread acceptance of this genus, the red warbler and pink-headed warbler were placed in various other warbler genera, including Setophaga (with the American redstart), Cardellina (with the red-faced warbler), and Basileuterus (a widespread genus of tropical warblers) — as well as the Old World warbler genus Sylvia and the Old World tit genus Parus. Recent DNA analysis shows that Ergaticus falls comfortably within the New World warbler clade, along with 18 other genera. It is closest to the genus Cardellina, with which it shares a common ancestor, and slightly more distantly related to the genus Wilsonia.

There are two sister species, separated by the low-lying Isthmus of Tehuantepec, in the genus. The red warbler, C. ruber, is found in the Mexican highlands north of the isthmus. Its three subspecies, which differ slightly in appearance, are found in three disjunct populations. The pink-headed warbler, C. versicolor, is found south of the isthmus, in the highlands of Chiapas, Mexico and western Guatemala. It is monotypic across its limited range. Though they are separated by geography and differ considerably in plumage, the two have sometimes been considered to be conspecific.

Ergaticus is the Latinized version of the Ancient Greek ergatikos, meaning "willing or able to work".

== List of species ==
The following five species are currently recognized.

Image	Scientific name	Common name	Distribution
	Cardellina canadensis	Canada warbler	Summers in Canada and northeastern United States and winters in northern South America.
	Cardellina pusilla	Wilson's warbler	Across Canada and south through the western United States, and winters from Mexico south through much of Central America.
	Cardellina rubrifrons	Red-faced warbler	Mexico and the US states of Arizona and New Mexico, and the Central American nations of El Salvador, Guatemala, and Honduras.
	Cardellina rubra	Red warbler	Mexican highlands north of the Isthmus of Tehuantepec.
	Cardellina versicolor	Pink-headed warbler	Southwestern Highlands of Guatemala and the central and southeastern Highlands of the Mexican state of Chiapas.

== Description ==
These are medium-sized warblers, measuring 12.5–13.5 cm (4.9–5.3 in) in length, (Note: By convention, length is measured from the tip of the bill to the tip of the tail on a dead bird (or skin) laid on its back.) and weighing 7.6–10 g (0.27–0.35 oz); the pink-headed warbler is, on average, slightly the heavier of the two. As adults, their overall color is red, with duller wings and tails; juveniles are tawny-brown, with slightly paler underparts. The red warbler has white or silvery-gray ear patches (the color depends on the subspecies), while the pink-headed warbler's head and chest are silvery-pink. The sexes are similar in both species. They have long, rounded wings and fairly long, rounded tails. They have small, narrow bills, with rictal bristles that extend more than halfway down their length.

== Habitat and range ==
Both the pink-headed and red warblers are birds of highland forest. The red warbler is found from 2,000 to 3,500 m (6,600 to 11,500 ft) above sea level, and the pink-headed warbler from 2,000 to 3,800 m (6,600 to 12,500 ft).
