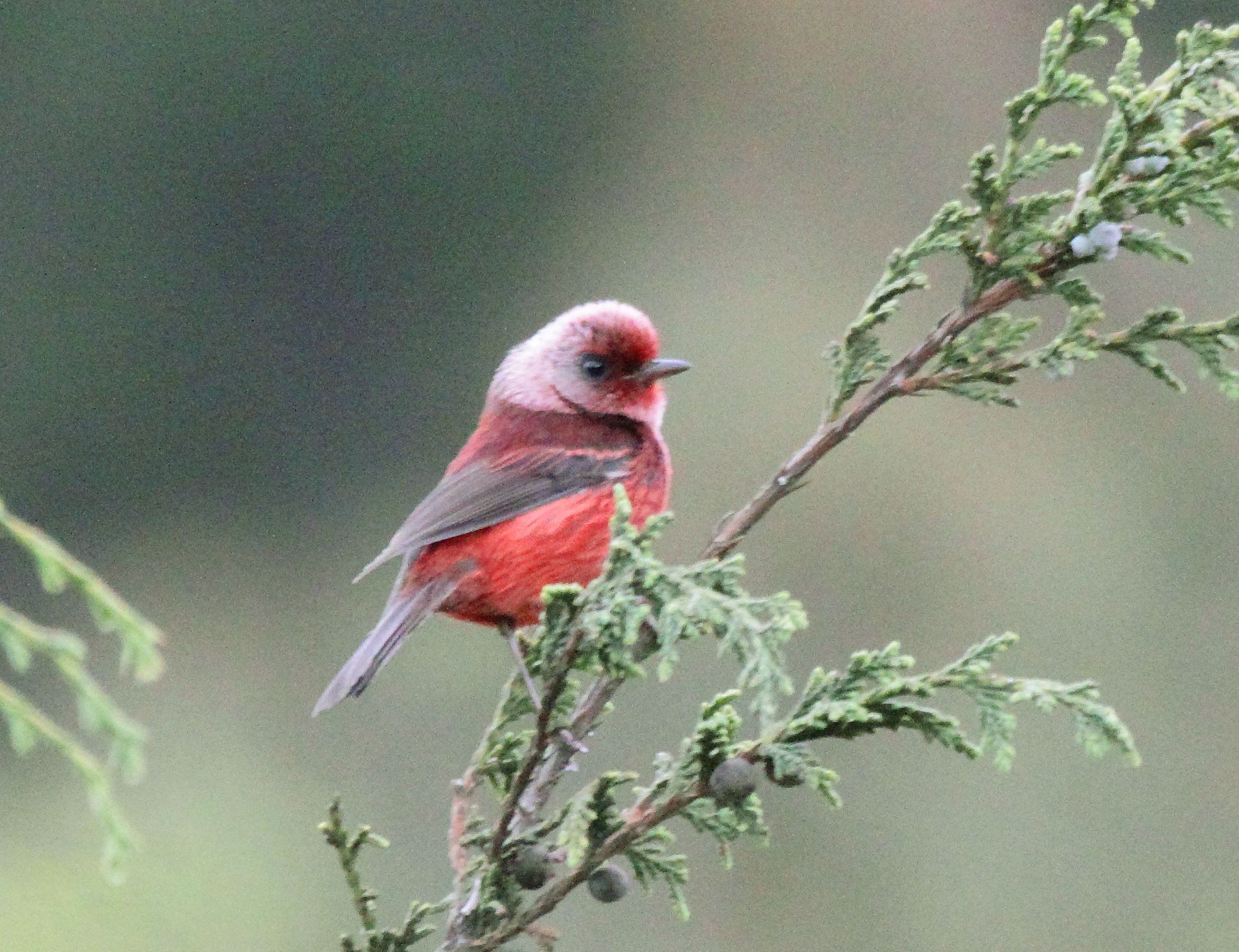

Conservation status
- Least Concern (IUCN 3.1)

Scientific classification
- Kingdom: Animalia
- Phylum: Chordata
- Class: Aves
- Order: Passeriformes
- Family: Parulidae
- Genus: Cardellina
- Species: C. versicolor

Binomial name
- Cardellina versicolor Salvin, 1863
- Range of pink-headed warbler

Synonyms
- Ergaticus versicolor

= Pink-headed warbler =

Species of bird

The pink-headed warbler (Cardellina versicolor) is a small passerine bird found in the southwestern highlands of Guatemala and the central and southeastern highlands of the Mexican state of Chiapas. The adult is primarily red, with a silvery-pink head and chest. It is a fairly common to common resident of humid to semi-humid pine-oak, pine-evergreen and evergreen forest and edge, at altitudes ranging from 1,800–3,500 m (5,900–11,500 ft) above sea level.

== Taxonomy ==
When Osbert Salvin first described the pink-headed warbler in 1864, he assigned it to the genus Cardellina. It was also briefly assigned to Setophaga, the genus of the American redstart, before being moved to the genus Ergaticus in 1881. It is monotypic across its limited range, but forms a superspecies with the red warbler, which is found in the highlands of Mexico, north of the Isthmus of Tehuantepec. Despite disjunct populations and considerably different plumages, the two have sometimes been considered to be conspecific.

A comprehensive 2010 paper by Irby Lovette and colleagues analysing mitochondrial and nuclear DNA of the wood-warblers found that the red and pink-headed warblers were each other's closest relative and that their common ancestor diverged from a lineage that gave rise to the red-faced warbler. The authors recommended moving the red and pink-headed warblers back to the genus Cardellina, which has been adopted by the International Ornithologists' Union (IOC).

"Pink-headed warbler" has been designated the official name by the IOC, and is a reference to its most notable feature. The genus name Cardellina is the diminutive of the Italian cardella, a regional name for the European goldfinch, while its specific name, versicolor, is Latin for 'of changeable or various colors'. The latter is a reference to the warbler's changeable head color, which, depending on the angle of the viewer, looks either frosty pink or a deeper red than the rest of its body. In Spanish, the species is called cabeza plateada or 'silvery head'.

== Description ==
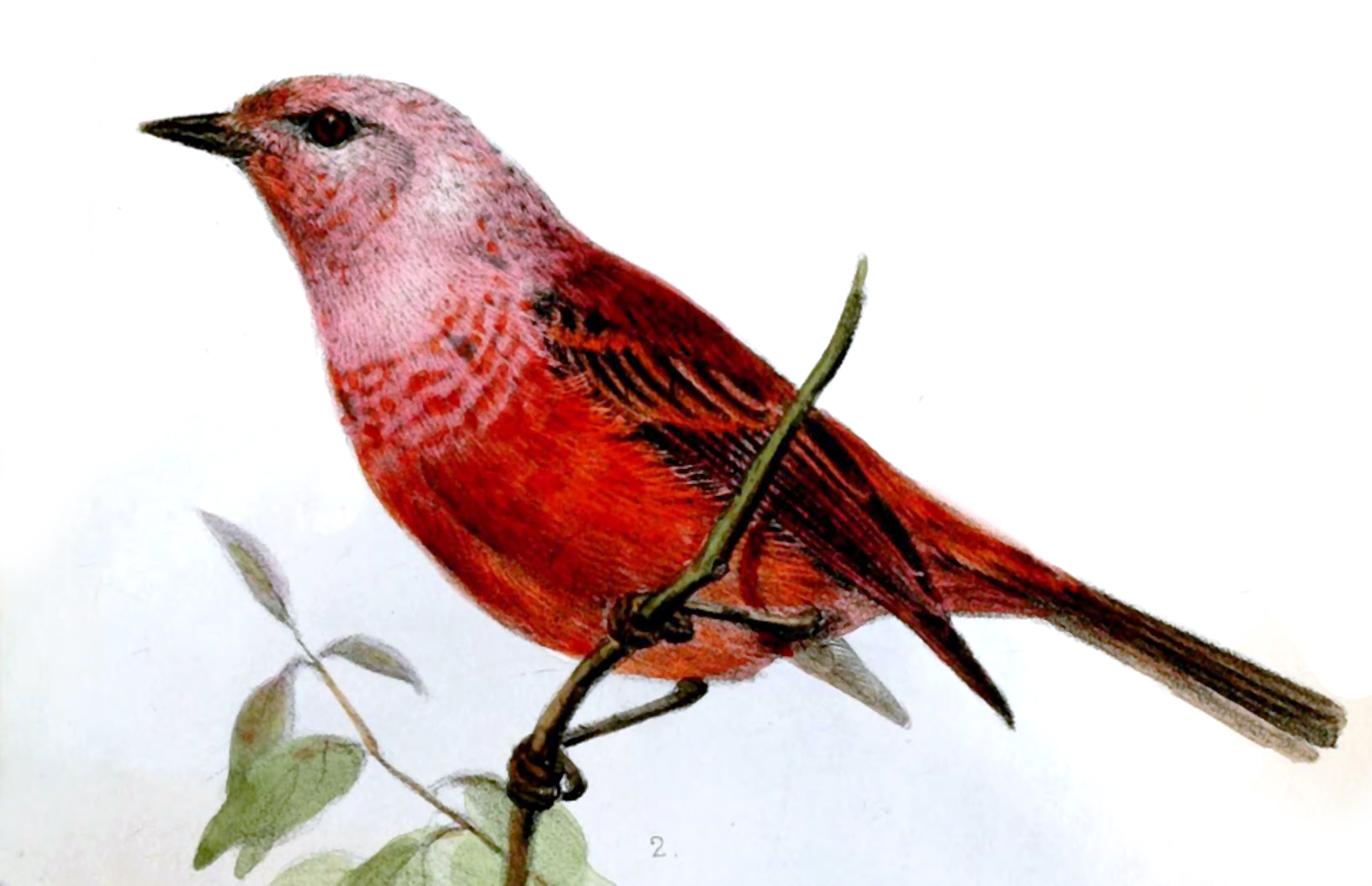
Illustration by Joseph Wolf (1863)

The pink-headed warbler measures 12.5–13.5 cm (4.9–5.3 in) in length, (Note: By convention, length is measured from the tip of the bill to the tip of the tail on a dead bird (or skin) laid on its back.) and weighs 10 g (0.35 oz). Both sexes have a similar plumage, though females are, on average, slightly duller overall. The adult has dark red upperparts, a silvery-pink chest and pinkish-red underparts. Its head is silvery-pink, with a reddish forehead, dusky lores and dark brown irises. Its bill is blackish, sometimes showing some horn color on the lower mandible, and its legs are flesh-colored.

The juvenile is a rich brown with slightly paler underparts. However, that plumage is quickly molted. By late summer, young birds are virtually indistinguishable from adults; only their unossified skulls distinguish them.

=== Voice ===
The pink-headed warbler's call is high, thin, and somewhat metallic, variously transcribed as tsiu, ssing or tseeip. It also has a low, weak chip that it uses to stay in contact with its mate. Its song is a series of short trills and chips, described as being "clear and cheery" and reminiscent of the song of the yellow warbler, as well as slower and less varied than that of the red warbler. Only males sing. While its calls are heard year-round, the pink-headed warbler sings mostly between February and May, and is silent during the rainy month of June.

== Distribution and habitat ==
The pink-headed warbler is endemic to the highlands of central and eastern Chiapas in Mexico, and to western Guatemala. It is a fairly common to common resident of humid to semi-humid pine-oak, pine-evergreen and evergreen forest and edge, at altitudes ranging from 1,800–3,500 m (5,900–11,500 ft) above sea level. It prefers forest with dense, undisturbed understory, but is also found in disturbed forest with damaged understory in its strongholds in Guatemala; this is thought to be suboptimal habitat. Though it is among the species expected to occur in El Salvador, it has not yet been reported there.

== Behavior ==
Except when they are feeding fledged young, it is uncommon to find more than two pink-headed warblers together. Mated pairs typically remain together year-round.

=== Food and feeding ===
Like other New World warblers, the pink-headed warbler is an insectivore, gleaning insects and other invertebrates from vegetation (primarily in dense understory) and making aerial sallies after flying prey. It typically forages between 2–5 m (6.6–16.4 ft) off the ground, only seldom foraging above 7 m (23 ft) — except during the breeding season, when the male may hunt near the tops of trees from which it sings, as high as 15 m (49 ft) up. The species often joins mixed species flocks that pass through its territory. There is some evidence that volcanic eruptions, which can coat vegetation with thick ash and impact insect populations, cause declines in pink-headed warbler numbers.

=== Breeding ===
In the spring, the male begins singing on good weather days in early February and continues for the next several months, with song frequency peaking between March and May. The female makes a globular nest from pine needles, building it on the ground in an area with a significant layer of fallen pine needles, often on a steep bank. She collects pine needles more than 50 ft (15 m) away from the nest's location, checking carefully for potential predators before returning to the nest site. Once the exterior is completed, she fills the bottom of the nest with soft fibrous materials and lines it with moss. She lays 2–4 eggs, which are white with a wreath of pale brown spots at the large end and a sparse speckling of pale brown spots elsewhere. The eggs average 17.1 mm × 13.3 mm (0.67 in × 0.52 in) in size. The female alone incubates for 16 days, sitting within the domed nest with her tail sticking out of the opening and her head turned so she can see out. She is restless while incubating, regularly changing her position. All told, she spends some 71 percent of her time on the nest during incubation, in stints of 13–35 minutes (average 20.1 minutes) with breaks of 4–13 minutes (average 8.3 minutes). Unlike many ground-nesting species, the pink-headed warbler has no distraction display.

The young pink-headed warbler has a red mouth lining, a feature which has been used by taxonomists working to unravel warbler systematics. Nestlings spend some 10–12 days in the nest before fledging. They begin pair bonding by their first autumn.

== Conservation and threats ==
Across its range, pink-headed warbler numbers are declining, primarily because the cloud forest upon which it depends is becoming increasingly fragmented. However, the species is currently rated as being of least concern by the International Union for Conservation of Nature due to its very large range and relatively slow rate of decline. Mexico's government lists it as endangered in that country. In 1898, it was described as being "common on the highlands of central Chiapas". However, in recent years it has become the least common of all wintering and resident warbler species in the highlands of northern Chiapas, based on point counts there.
