= Isospora cardellinae =

Scientific classification
- Domain: Eukaryota
- Clade: Diaphoretickes
- Clade: SAR
- Clade: Alveolata
- Phylum: Apicomplexa
- Class: Conoidasida
- Order: Eucoccidiorida
- Family: Eimeriidae
- Genus: Isospora
- Species: I. cardellinae

Binomial name
- Isospora cardellinae Salgado, 2016

Species of single-celled organism

Isospora cardellinae is a species of internal parasite classified under Coccidia. It has been recovered from the red warbler.
