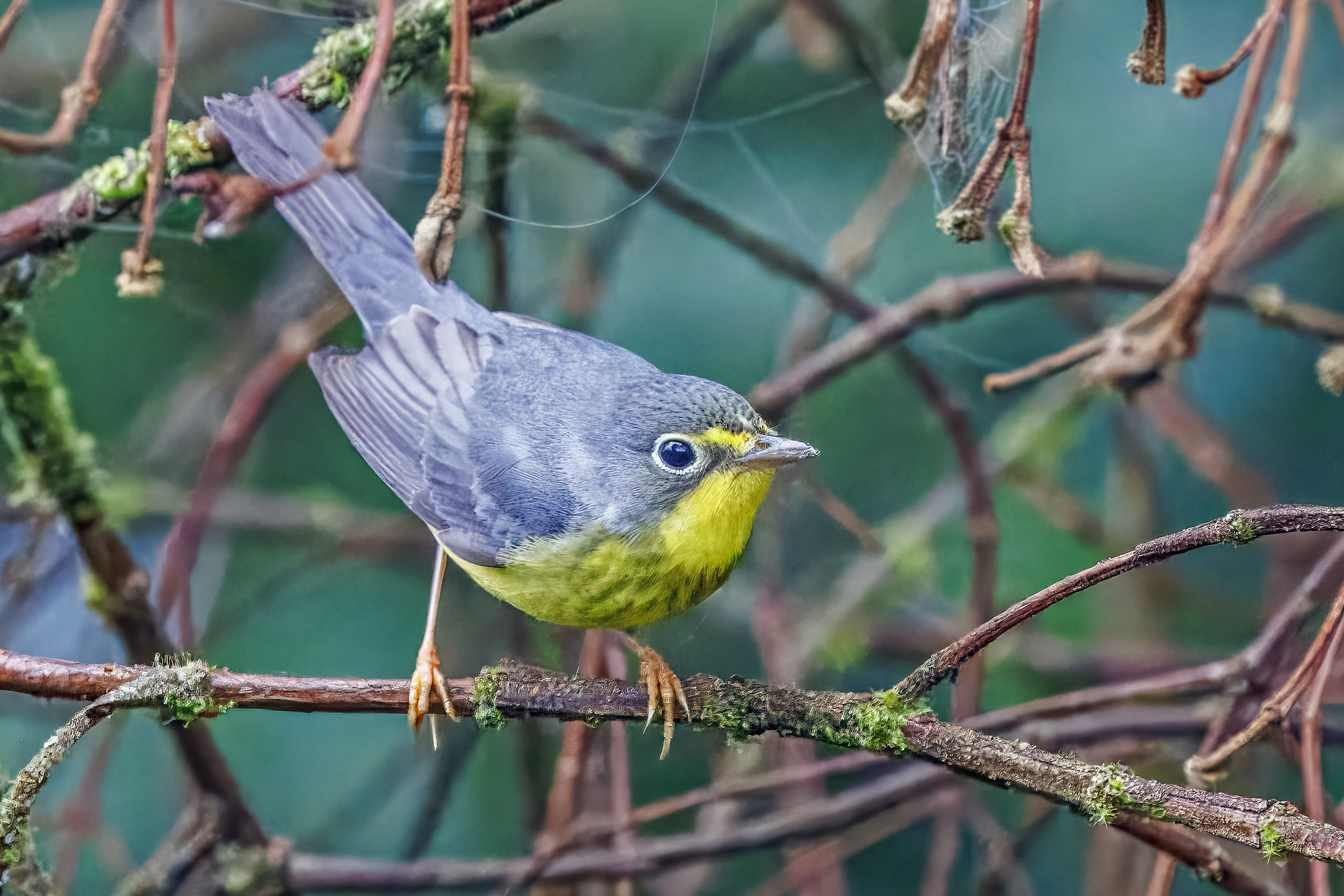
- Male, Ecuador
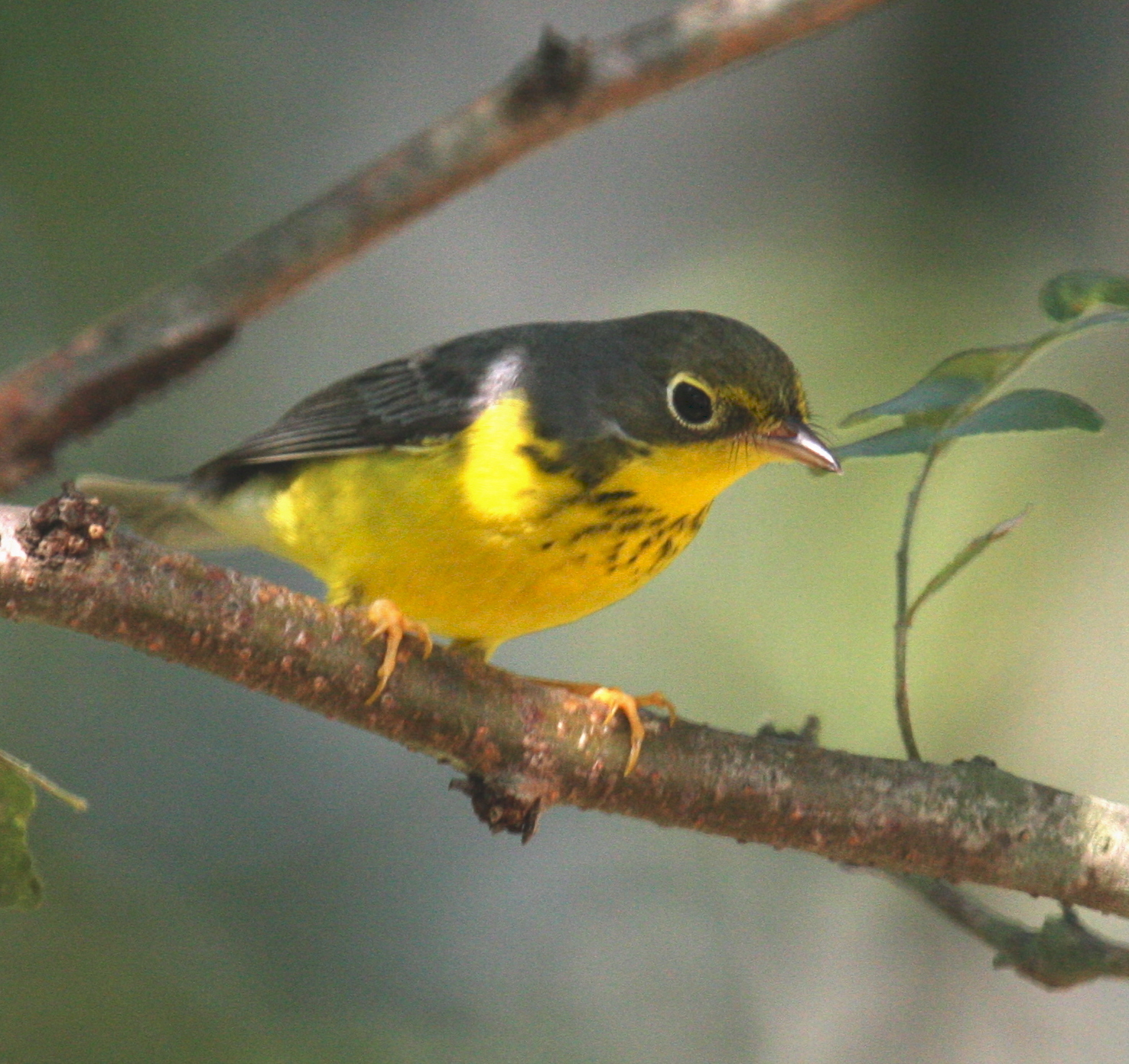
- Female showing characteristic lighter neck markings and grey top plumage

Conservation status
- Least Concern (IUCN 3.1)

- Threatened (COSEWIC)

Scientific classification
- Kingdom: Animalia
- Phylum: Chordata
- Class: Aves
- Order: Passeriformes
- Family: Parulidae
- Genus: Cardellina
- Species: C. canadensis

Binomial name
- Cardellina canadensis (Linnaeus, 1766)
- Range of C. canadensis Breeding range Wintering range

Synonyms
- Muscicapa canadensis Linnaeus, 1766; Wilsonia canadensis (Linnaeus, 1766)

= Canada warbler =

Species of bird

The Canada warbler (Cardellina canadensis) is a small boreal songbird of the New World warbler family (Parulidae). It summers in Canada and northeastern United States and winters in northern South America.

== Taxonomy ==
In 1760 the French zoologist Mathurin Jacques Brisson included a description of the Canada warbler in his Ornithologie based on a specimen collected in Canada. He used the French name Le gobe-mouche cendré de Canada and the Latin name Muscicapa Canadensis Cinerea. Although Brisson coined Latin names, these do not conform to the binomial system and are not recognised by the International Commission on Zoological Nomenclature. When in 1766 the Swedish naturalist Carl Linnaeus updated his Systema Naturae for the twelfth edition, he added 240 species that had been previously described by Brisson. One of these was the Canada warbler. Linnaeus included a brief description, coined the binomial name Muscicapa canadensis, and cited Brisson's work. The species is now placed in the genus Cardellina that was introduced by the French naturalist Charles Lucien Bonaparte in 1850. The species is monotypic.

== Description ==
The Canada warbler is sometimes called the "necklaced warbler", because of the band of dark streaks across its chest. The adults have minimal sexual dimorphism, although the male's "necklace" is darker and more conspicuous and also has a longer tail. Adults are 12–15 cm (4.7–5.9 in) long, have a wingspan of 17–22 cm (6.7–8.7 in), and weigh 9–13 g (0.32–0.46 oz).

The chest, throat, and belly of the bird are yellow, and its back is dark grey. It has no wingbars or tail spots, but the underside of the tail is white. It has a yellow line in front of its eye in the direction of the beak, but the most striking facial feature is the white eyerings or "spectacles". Immature specimens have similar coloration as adults but duller and with less pronounced facial features.

=== Song ===
The song of this bird is loud and highly variable, resembling chip chewy sweet dichetty. Their calls are low chup's.

A 2013 study showed that male Canada warblers have two performance-encoded song types. Mode I, used mostly during the day, when unpaired either alone or near a female during early nesting, involves stereotyped songs sung slowly and regularly. Mode II, used at dawn, after pairing and when near another male, involves variable songs, sung rapidly with irregular rhythm and chirping between songs. Most of the phrases used were common to both modes, a feature unique among parulids, which ordinarily have an individual's repertoire separated into two distinct parts.

In 2000, a female Canada warbler (or a post-hatching year-old male that failed to moult, something never before observed) in Giles County, Virginia was observed singing. Its repertoire consisted of a repeated song of 12 to 13 notes as well as several shorter songs consisting of the first five or six notes of the longer song. The bird did not respond to the playback of its own song or a recording of a male. Although female singing among the parulids has long been considered "idiosyncratic", singing by female Canada warblers is supported by the observation of female singing in congener Wilson's warbler and the closely related hooded warbler.

== Distribution and habitat ==
During the breeding season 82% of the population can be found in Canada and 18% in the United States. In Canada, the summer range extends from southeastern Yukon to Nova Scotia. In the United States, the range extends from northern Minnesota to northern Pennsylvania, east to Long Island, New York. It also nests in the high Appalachians as far south as Georgia. In winter, the Canada warbler's range extends from Guyana to northwestern Bolivia around the northern and western side of the Andean crest.

In both summer and winter seasons, the Canada warbler inhabits moist thickets. During the breeding season, the bird "nests in riparian thickets, brushy ravines, forest bogs, etc. at a wide range of elevations and across a variety of forest types. In the northwestern parts of its range, it frequents aspen forests; in the center of the range, it is found in forested wetlands and swamps; and in the south, it occupies montane rhododendron thickets." In the winter, it prefers mid- and upper-elevation habitats. In northern Minnesota, a study found that Canada warblers inhabited the shrub-forest edge, rather than mature forests or open fields with shrub. In New England, the Canada warbler was found to be "disturbance specialists" moving into patches of forests recovering from wind throw or timber removal. Because of its preference for low-height foraging in deciduous forests, it may be bounded at higher elevations as suitable habitat disappears and it suffers competition from the black-throated blue warbler which prefers similar habitats.

Two accidentals have been observed in Europe. The first, a moribund male was caught in Sandgerði, Iceland on September 29, 1973. The second was a first winter, probably female observed for five days in October 2006 in County Clare, Ireland.

=== Migration ===
The Canada warbler is one of the last birds to arrive at the breeding grounds and one of the first to leave. They may spend only two months there. They fly at night along a route generally south and west to the Texas coast, then to southern Mexico. The arrive at the winter grounds in northwestern South America in late September to early October.

== Behavior and ecology ==
=== Breeding ===
At least 60–65% of the population nests in boreal forests in Canada, the Great Lakes region of the United States, New England and through the Appalachians. The birds are at least seasonally monogamous. Sightings of pairs during migration in Panama have led to the conclusion that they are permanently monogamous. This conclusion, however, is contradicted by the sexes' wintering at different elevations.

Males arrive at the breeding grounds in the first two weeks of May. Females build the nests on or very close to the ground in dense cover. The nests are made up of root masses, hummocks, stumps, stream banks, mossy logs, and sometimes leaf litter and grass clumps. Moss covering is frequent.

The female lays four to five eggs and incubates for about 12 days. The chicks remain in the nest for about 10 days after hatching and are dependent on their parents for two to three weeks after they leave the nest.

The age at which the young leave the nest is not known. Once independent they spend almost all their time in the understory, on the ground or in bushes. The post-juvenile bird undergoes a partial moult involving all body feathers and wing coverlets. This may be completed before the first migration.

The oldest known specimen was a male found in Quebec in 1982 at least 8 years old, having been banded in 1975.

=== Food and feeding ===
The Canada warbler eats insects for the most part, including beetles, mosquitoes, flies, moths, and smooth caterpillars such as cankerworms, supplemented by spiders, snails, worms, and, at least seasonally, fruit. It employs several foraging tactics, such as flushing insects from foliage and catching them on the wing (which it does more frequently than other warblers), and searching upon the ground among fallen leaves. When they occasionally hover glean, males tend to fly higher than females on breeding grounds. In the tropics of South America, it forages in mixed flocks with other birds, usually 3–30 feet above ground in denser foliage.

== Diseases and parasites ==
In the summer of 1947 a single specimen of Canada warbler from Virginia (and one specimen of another warbler from Georgia) were found to be hosts of a new species of acanthocephalan worm, which was named Apororhynchus amphistomi, the third species of that genus and the first in North America. In the southern part of the breeding range, nest parasitism by cowbirds is frequent.

== Status ==
Partners in Flight estimates a global population of 4 million, while the American Bird Conservancy estimates that 1.5 million individuals exist.

Threats to the Canada warbler include forest fragmentation; over-browsing of the understory by deer, acid rain, and the spread of the woolly adelgid (a killer of fir and hemlock trees). Owing to these factors the Breeding Bird Survey data show a population decline of 3.2 percent per year throughout the Canada warbler's breeding range, with the greatest declines in the Northeast. The species has been assessed as "threatened" by the Committee on the Status of Endangered Wildlife in Canada. The IUCN, however, ranks the Canada warbler as a species of least concern.

The Canada warbler is protected at the federal level in both Canada and the United States.

== In art ==
John James Audubon illustrates the Canada warbler in Birds of America (published, London 1827–38) as Plate 73 entitled "Bonaparte's Flycatching-Warbler—Muscicapa bonapartii." The single female (now properly identified as a Canada warbler) is shown perched on a great magnolia (Magnolia grandiflora) branch that was painted by Joseph Mason. The final, combined image was engraved and colored by Robert Havell Jr. at the Havell workshops in London. The original painting was purchased by the New York Historical Society.

== General sources ==
- Bent, Arthur Cleveland (1953). "Canada Warbler". Life Histories of North American Wood Warblers: Order Passeriformes. Washington, D.C.: U.S. Government Printing Office. pp. 646–56. LCCN 53061305. Hosted online by HathiTrust.
- Conway, Courtney J. (1999). Canada Warbler (Wilsonia canadensis). The Birds of North America: Life Histories for the 21st Century (A. Poole, P. Stettenheim, and F. Gill, series editors). Vol. 421. Washington, D.C.: American Ornithologists' Union.
- Dunn, Jon J.; Garrett, Kimball L. (1997). A Field Guide to Warblers of North America. Boston: Houghton Mifflin Co. ISBN 978-0-395-38971-3.
