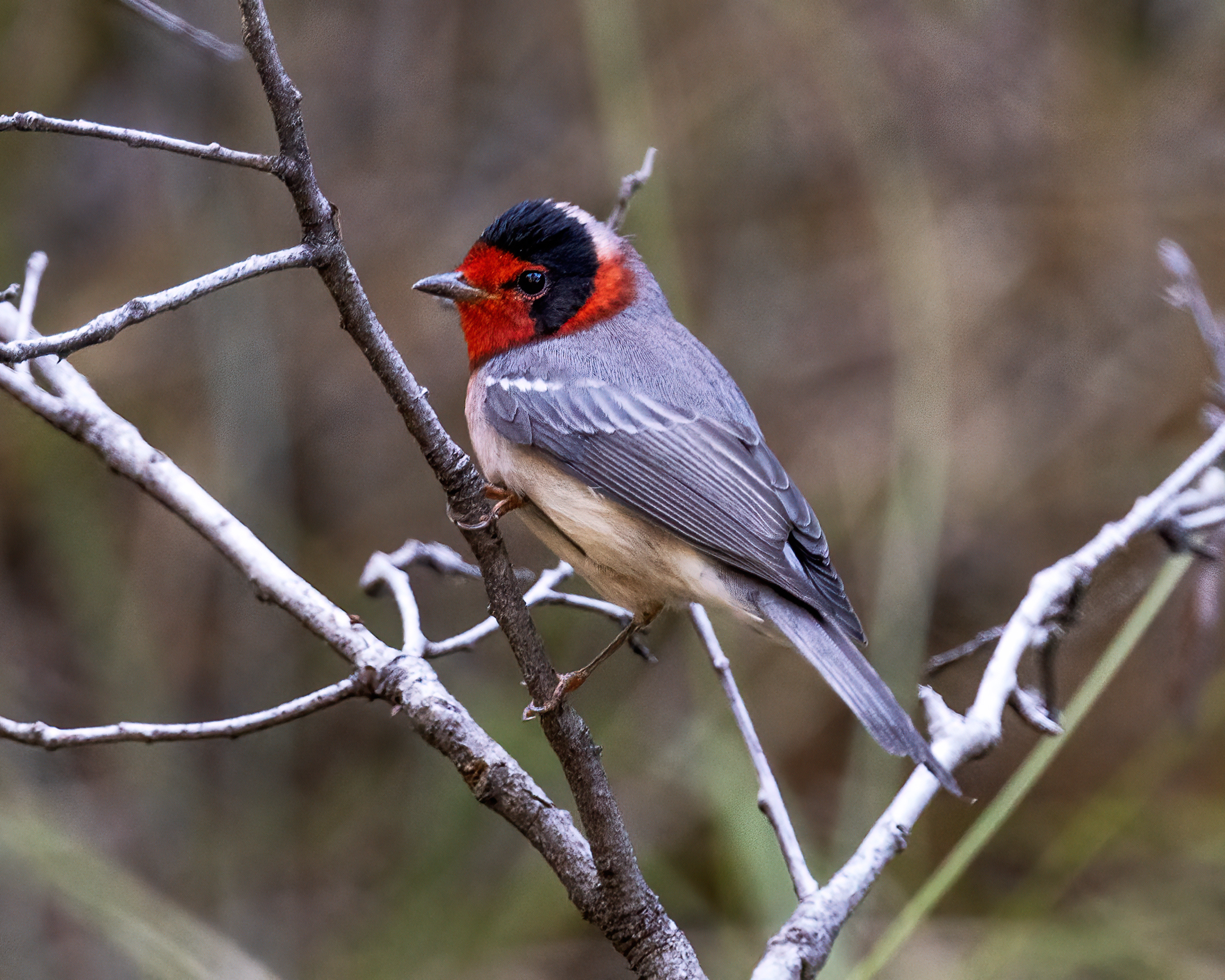
- Adult in Madera Canyon, Arizona

Conservation status
- Least Concern (IUCN 3.1)

Scientific classification
- Kingdom: Animalia
- Phylum: Chordata
- Class: Aves
- Order: Passeriformes
- Family: Parulidae
- Genus: Cardellina
- Species: C. rubrifrons

Binomial name
- Cardellina rubrifrons (Giraud, 1841)
- Breeding range Breeding and wintering range Wintering range

Audio

= Red-faced warbler =

Species of bird

The red-faced warbler (Cardellina rubrifrons) is a species of bird in the family Parulidae, the New World warblers. It is found from the southwestern United States south to El Salvador and Honduras.

== Taxonomy and systematics ==
The red-faced warbler was formally described in 1841 with the binomial Muscicapa rubrifrons and the English name "red fronted fly catcher". It is monotypic.

== Description ==
The red-faced warbler is about 14 cm (5.5 in) long and weighs an average of about 10 g (0.35 oz). The sexes have almost the same plumage. Adult males have a mostly bright scarlet face, throat, and upper breast with a black crown, black ear coverts, and a white hindcrown and upper nape. Their lower nape and upperparts are mostly slate gray with a white rump. Their wings and tail are grayish brown with paler feather edges. Their median secondary coverts have whitish tips that form a distinct wing bar and the greater secondary coverts have pale gray tips whose resulting wing bar is very pale. Their lower breast and belly are grayish white that becomes whiter on the undertail coverts. Adult females have the same pattern as males but have a duller scarlet to chrome orange face. Both sexes have a dark brown iris, a black to black-brown bill with a yellow base to the mandible, and black legs and feet. Juveniles have a rich brown-gray head, neck, and breast and a grayer back than adults. Their tail and wings are dark gray; the latter have two whitish wing bars. Their underparts are white. They have a paler bill and legs than adults.

== Distribution and habitat ==
The red-faced warbler is found from north-central Arizona to west-central New Mexico in the U. S. and from there south through central Mexico to central Oaxaca. It has further disjunct ranges from central Guerrero to western Oaxaca and in several locations in Guatemala, El Salvador, and Honduras. Small numbers have been recorded in southern California and Texas and it has possibly bred in those states. The species has also been documented as a vagrant as far north as Teton County, Wyoming and in the east in Harris County, Georgia and Levy County, Florida. The last, a photographic record, is from May 2026 and as of July 2026 had not been evaluated by the Florida Ornithological Society Records Committee.

The red-faced warbler primarily inhabits fir (Abies), pine (Pinus), and Pine-oak forest montane forest. It also occurs in landscapes with mixed conifers and deciduous trees such as quaking aspen (Populus tremuloides) and canyon maple (Acer grandidentatum). Overall it ranges in elevation between 1,500 and 3,100 m (4,900 and 10,200 ft). In its non-breeding range south of Mexico in ranges between 650 and 2,650 m (2,100 and 8,700 ft).

== Behavior ==
=== Movement ===
The red-faced warbler is a nearly complete migrant. Populations that breed from the United States south to central Durango withdraw completely for the non-breeding season. In the rest of Durango and slightly further south the species is found year-round, though the individuals there may be a mix of migrants from the north and breeders. The species is found south of there only in the non-breeding season. Southward migration begins in July in the U. S. and birds usually reach their wintering grounds by September. Northward migration begins in late February and most individuals reach Arizona and New Mexico in May.

=== Feeding ===
During the breeding season the red-faced warbler feed almost exclusively on insects with lepidoptera caterpillars being a major component of its diet. It is thought to also feed mostly or entirely on insects in migration and on the wintering grounds. It forages mostly by gleaning from leaves, conifer needles, twigs, and branches while perched or hovering. It also takes prey in mid-air. It sometimes forages in small flocks during migration and in winter; the latter flocks often include other small insectivorous species.

=== Breeding ===
The red-faced warbler is territorial when breeding and is generally socially monogamous though extra-pair copulations are known. In Arizona breeding extends from early May to mid-July but is concentrated between late May and late June. Females build the nest, an open cup with an outer layer of dead leaves, pine needles, and bark lined with grass and often also animal hair. It is placed on the ground, usually in a hollow, and often hidden under a "roof" of plant stems, a log, grass, or a rock. The clutch is usually four or five eggs though clutches of three and six are known. The eggs are white with fine brown or chestnut speckles. The female alone incubates, for 13 to 17 days. Fledging occurs 11 to 13 days after hatch. The female alone broods nestlings but both parents provision them.

=== Vocalization ===
Male red-faced warblers sing during the breeding season, at dawn often from a treetop and then at any level as the day progresses. Its song is variable but generally has several sections, each of which has up to three "clear slurred phrases". Both sexes call a chip note year-round.

== Status ==
The IUCN has assessed the red-faced warbler as being of Least Concern. It has a very large range; its estimated population of at least 350,000 mature individuals is believed to be decreasing. No immediate threats have been identified. The red-faced warbler "seems to be sensitive to degradation of habitat. Numbers diminish drastically or vanish altogether as a consequence of logging on the breeding grounds." In winter it is fairly common in Guatemala and rare in El Salvador and Honduras.

== Gallery ==
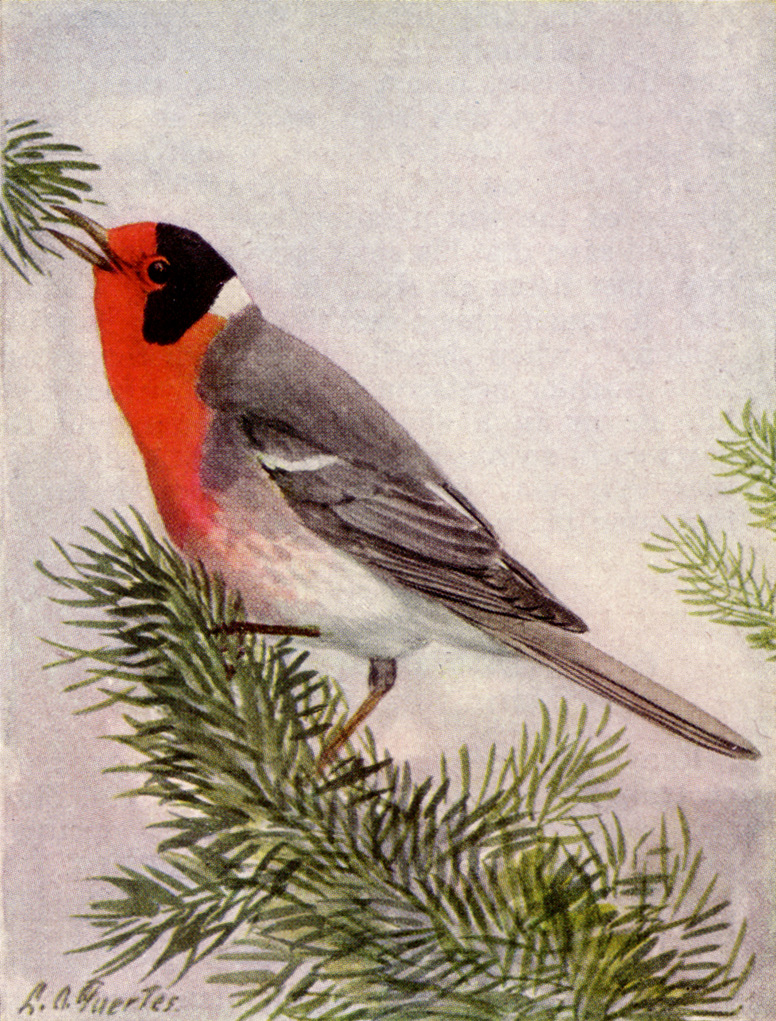
Illustration by Louis Agassiz Fuertes (1917)

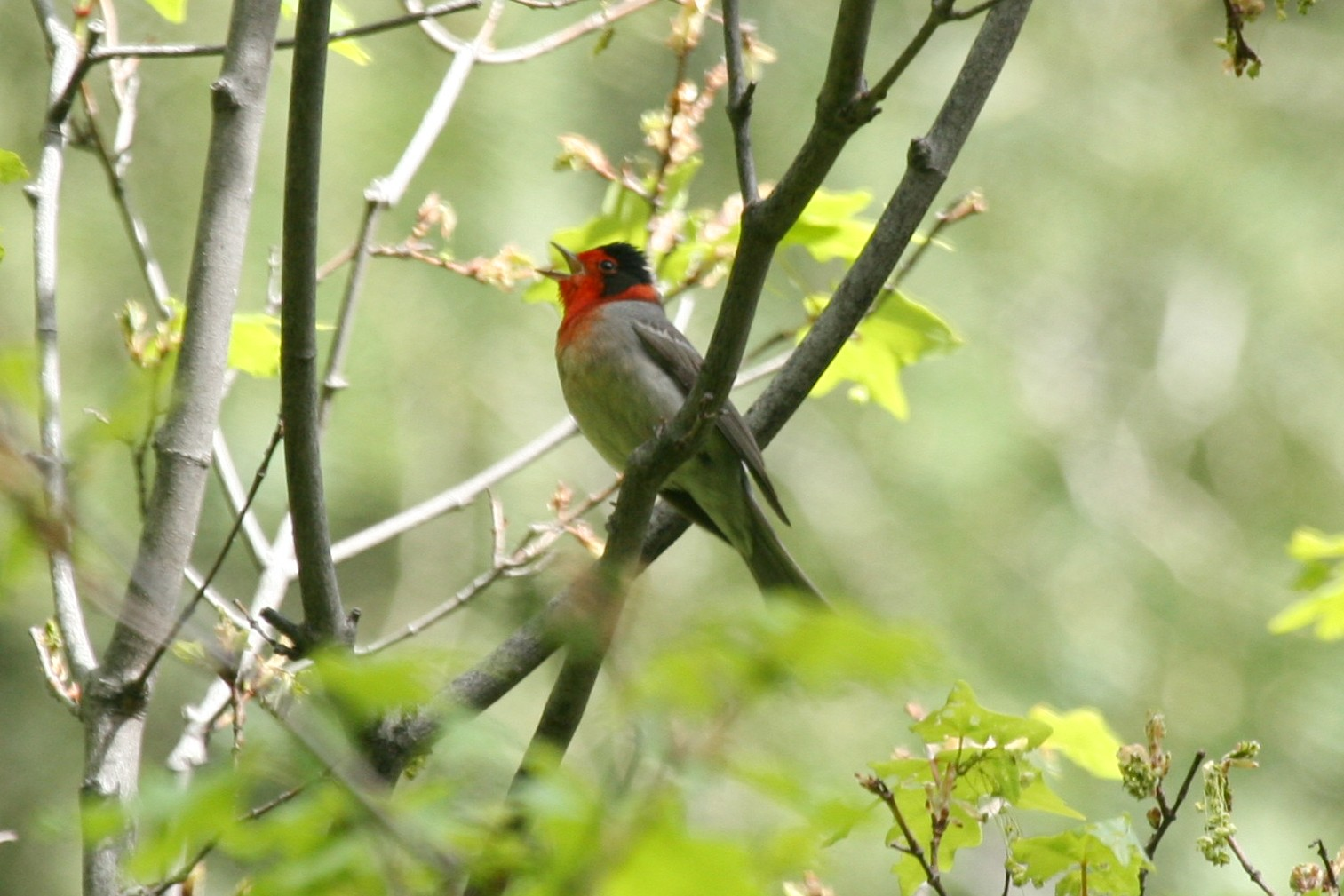
Singing adult

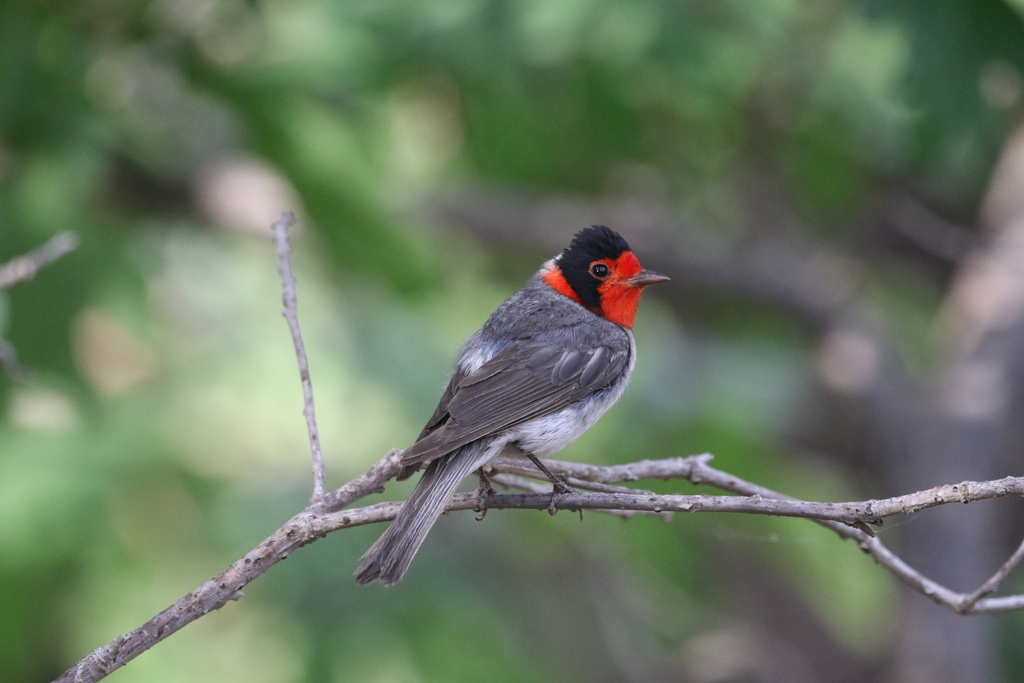
Adult in Coconino National Forest, Arizona
