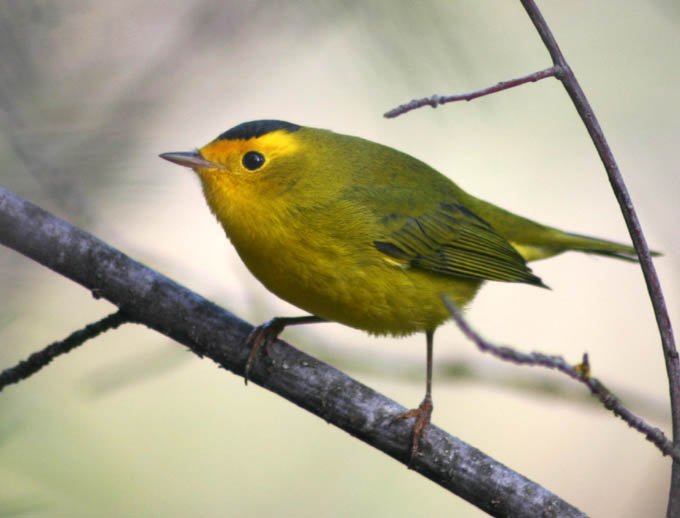
- Adult male

Conservation status
- Least Concern (IUCN 3.1)

Scientific classification
- Kingdom: Animalia
- Phylum: Chordata
- Class: Aves
- Order: Passeriformes
- Family: Parulidae
- Genus: Cardellina
- Species: C. pusilla

Binomial name
- Cardellina pusilla (Wilson, A, 1811)
- Range of C. pusilla Breeding range Wintering range

Synonyms
- Muscicapa pusilla (protonym); Wilsonia pusilla Myiodioctes pusillus

= Wilson's warbler =

Species of bird

Wilson's warbler (Cardellina pusilla) is a small New World warbler. It is greenish above and yellow below, with rounded wings and a long, slim tail. The male has a black crown patch; depending on the subspecies, that mark is reduced or absent in the female. It breeds across Canada and south through the western United States, and winters from Mexico south through much of Central America. It is a very rare vagrant to western Europe.

== Taxonomy ==
Wilson's warbler was formally described in 1811 by the ornithologist Alexander Wilson under the binomial name Muscicapa pusilla. The type locality is southern New Jersey. The species was moved to the genus Wilsonia by the naturalist and ornithologist Charles Lucien Bonaparte in 1838. Zoologist Thomas Nuttall moved it to Sylvania in 1840, and by 1845, many authors included it in Myiodioctes. In 1899, the American Ornithological Union returned the species to Wilsonia. The species is currently assigned to the genus Cardellina. The genus name Cardellina is a diminutive of the Italian dialect Cardella, a name for the European goldfinch, and the specific epithet pusilla means "very small".

There are three recognized subspecies:

- C. p. pusilla was described by Alexander Wilson in 1811.
- C. p. pileolata was described by German naturalist Peter Simon Pallas in 1811.
- C. p. chryseola was described by Robert Ridgway in 1902.

The chryseola subspecies, which nests in northern coastal California to southwestern coastal Canada, has a distinctive orange-tinged yellow forehead. The population of the subspecies has declined sharply in the 21st century because it migrates preferentially to the southern end of the Baja Peninsula in Mexico, where luxury resort and residential developments have replaced the bird's habitat.

== Description ==
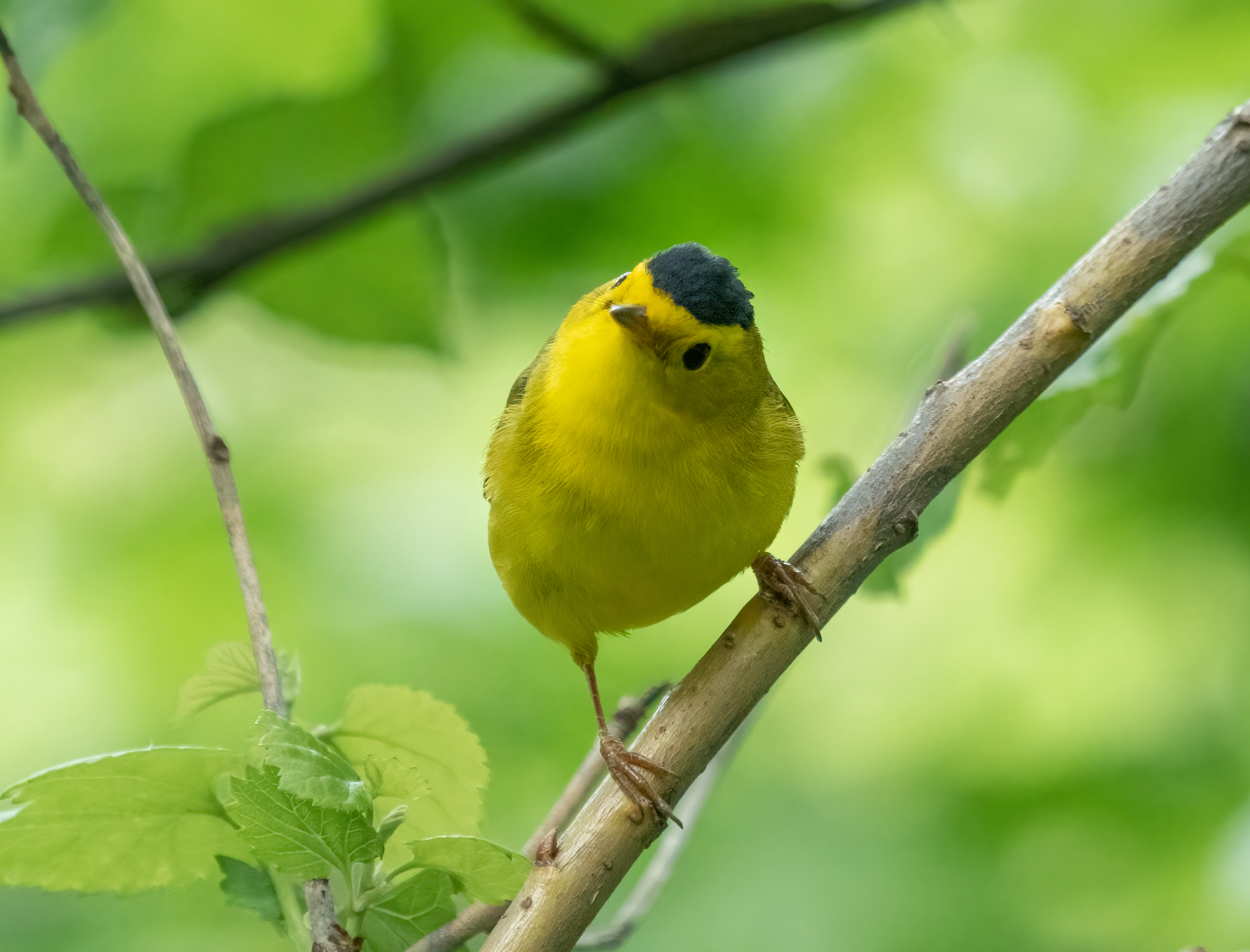
Wilson's warbler in a tree in New York

Wilson's warbler is a small passerine, ranging from 10 to 12 cm (3.9 to 4.7 in) in length, with a wingspan of 14–17 cm (5.5–6.7 in) and a mass of 5–10 g (0.18–0.35 oz). It has a plain green-brown back and yellow underparts. The male has a small black cap. Males of the western race C. p. chryseola are greener above and brighter than males of the eastern, nominate race. Individuals from Alaska and the west-central portion of the species' range average slightly larger than those found in eastern and Pacific coastal populations. Its song is a chattering series of loud descending notes. The call is a flat "chuff".

Wilson's warbler resembles the yellow warbler: the latter is readily distinguished by its different shape, yellow wing markings, and yellow tail spots.

Wilson's warbler song recorded in Minnesota, in mid-May

== Distribution and habitat ==
The breeding habitat is fairly open woodland with undergrowth or shrubs and thickets in moist areas with streams, ponds, bogs, and wet clearings. Wilson's warbler breeds in northern Canada and the western US; it winters in overgrown clearings and coffee plantations, forest edges, deciduous forests, tropical evergreens, pine-oak forests, mangroves, thorn-scrub, riparian gallery forests, brushy fields, and mixed forests. At all seasons, it prefers secondary growth, riparian habitats, lakes, montane and boreal forests with overgrown clearcuts. It is a very rare vagrant to Western Europe.

== Behavior and ecology ==
=== Breeding ===
Nesting generally begins in early March in west coast populations, and extends into August in the northern range. The female does the majority of the nest building. The cup nest is typically constructed of vegetation and lined with grasses and hair. It is often sunken into moss or sedges at the base of shrubs. The clutch varies from 2 to 7 eggs, which are creamy or off-white with fine reddish spots. The young are altricial. The montane populations generally have a higher clutch size and nest success rate than those on the coast. The eggs hatch at 11–15 days and the young fledge at 8–13 days; adults care for them for several weeks. Some montane populations are polygamous (one male breeds with multiple females). Wilson's warbler is a frequent host for the brown-headed cowbird.

=== Feeding ===
Wilson's warbler is an insectivore, feeding primarily on insects gleaned from leaves and twigs, or caught by flycatching. Some of these insects include beetles, bees, or caterpillars. Wilson's warbler is an active forager, moving rapidly through shrubs, on the ground, and sometimes in taller trees during the winter. Feeding birds often twitch their tails or flick their wings nervously. The observed feeding rate of the male Wilson's warbler was not significantly different between males with or without mates. It also eats a few berries.
