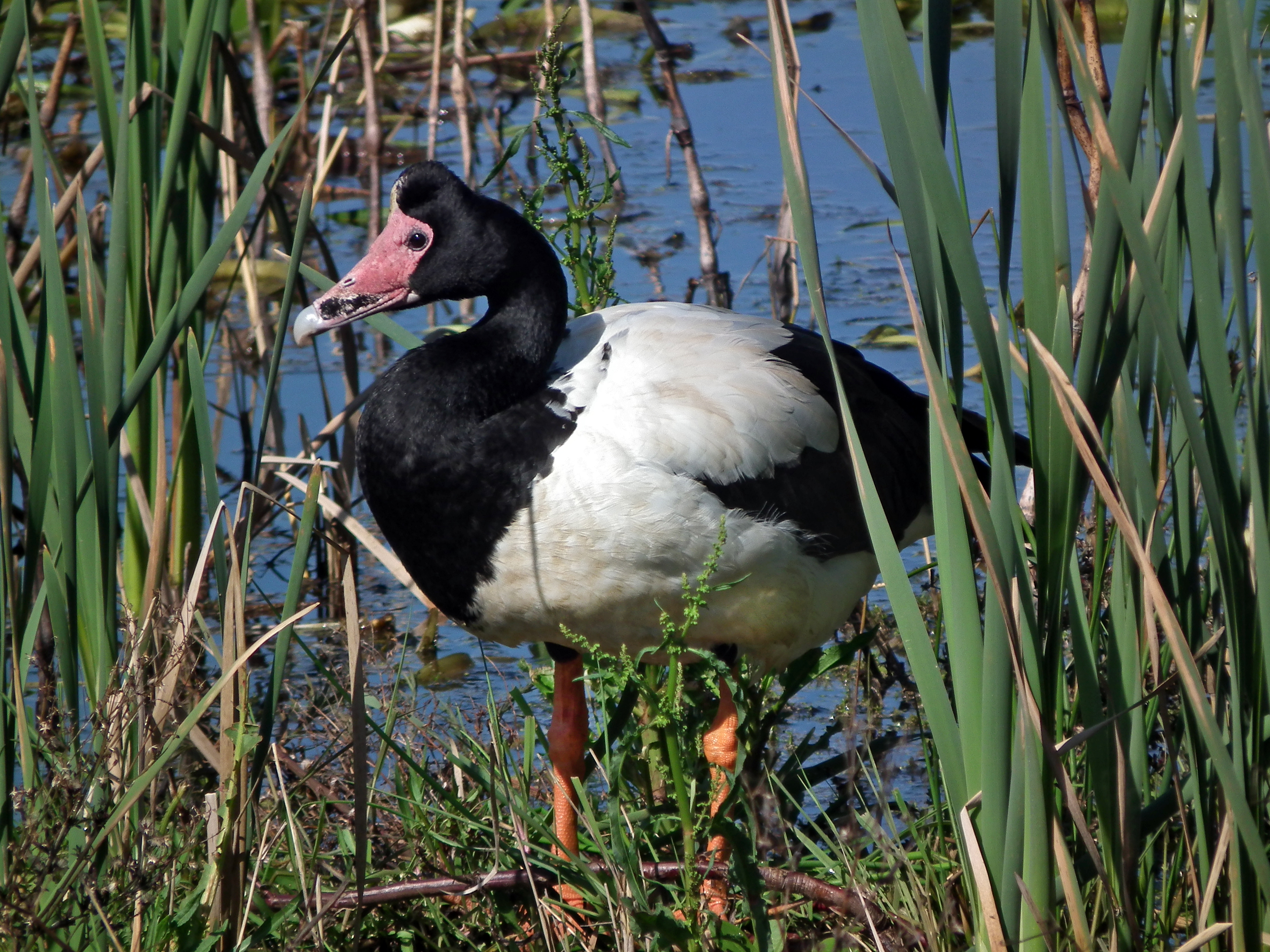
- Modern magpie goose, Anseranas semipalmata

Scientific classification
- Kingdom: Animalia
- Phylum: Chordata
- Class: Aves
- Order: Anseriformes
- Superfamily: Anseranatoidea; Sclater, 1880
- Family: Anseranatidae; Sclater, 1880

Type species
- Anseranas semipalmata Latham, 1798

Genera
- †Anatalavis?; Anseranas; †Anserpica; †Eoanseranas

= Anseranatidae =

Magpie-geese Temporal range: Eocene-recent, 34–0 Ma possible Late Cretaceous record

Family of birds

Anseranatidae, the magpie-geese, is a biological family of waterbirds. The only living species, the magpie goose, is a resident breeder in northern Australia and in southern New Guinea.

== Systematics and evolution ==
This family is placed in the order Anseriformes, having the characteristic bill structure, but is considered to be distinct from the other families in this taxon. The related and extant families, Anhimidae (screamers) and Anatidae (ducks, geese and swans), contain all the other taxa.

A cladistic study of the morphology of waterfowl found that the magpie goose was an early and distinctive offshoot, diverging after screamers and before all other ducks, geese and swans.

This family is quite old, a living fossil, having apparently diverged before the Cretaceous–Paleogene extinction event – the relative Vegavis iaai lived some 68–67 million years ago. The fossil record is limited, nonetheless. The enigmatic genus Anatalavis (Hornerstown Late Cretaceous or Early Paleocene of New Jersey, USA – London Clay Early Eocene of Walton-on-the-Naze, England) is sometimes considered to be the earliest known anseranatid. Another Paleogene bird genus sometimes considered an anseranatid is Anserpica, from the Late Oligocene of Billy-Créchy (France). The earliest known member of the group in Australia is Eoanseranas handae. It is represented by fossils found in the late Oligocene Carl Creek Limestone of Queensland. Additional fossils from North America and Europe suggest that the family was spread across the globe during the late Paleogene period.
