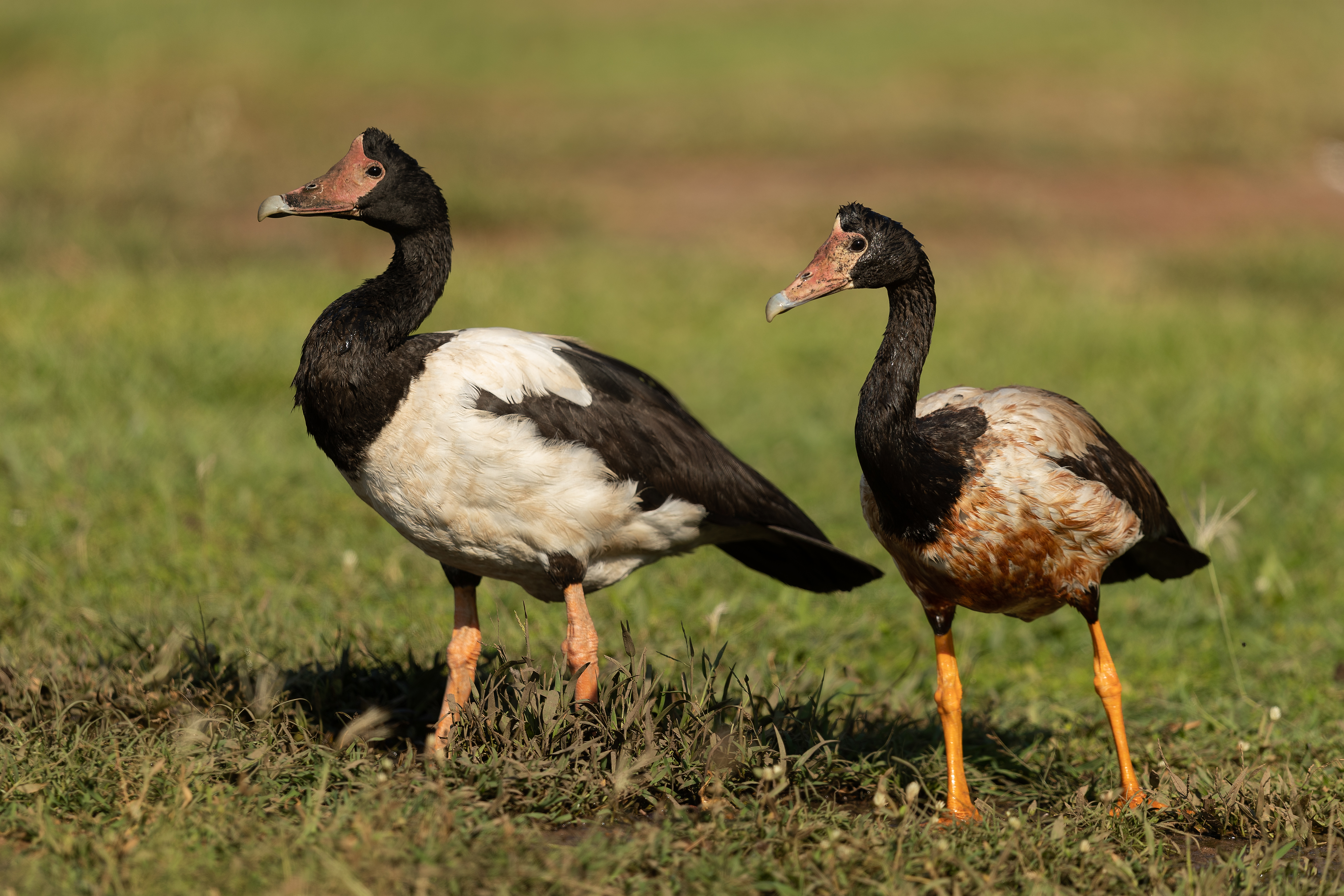
- Near East Point, Northern Territory

Conservation status
- Least Concern (IUCN 3.1)

Scientific classification
- Kingdom: Animalia
- Phylum: Chordata
- Class: Aves
- Order: Anseriformes
- Family: Anseranatidae
- Genus: Anseranas; Lesson, 1828
- Species: A. semipalmata

Binomial name
- Anseranas semipalmata (Latham, 1798)
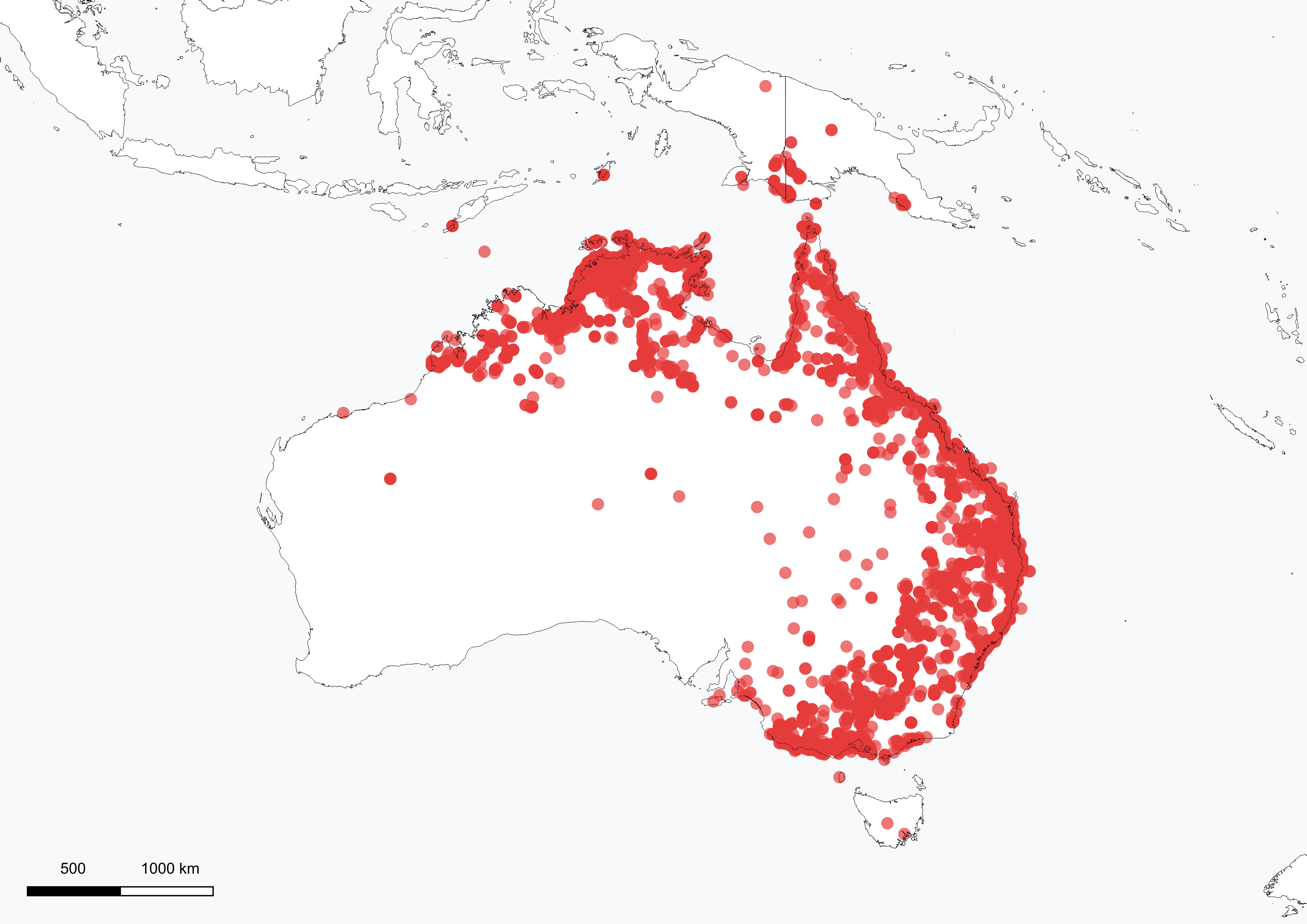
- Species distribution

Synonyms
- Anas semipalmata Latham, 1798

= Magpie goose =

Species of waterfowl

The magpie goose (Anseranas semipalmata) is the sole living representative species of the family Anseranatidae. This waterbird is found in northern Australia and southern New Guinea. The species is not truly migratory but it sometimes travels large distances to find food and water, especially when not breeding, and is sometimes recorded outside its core range. The species was once also widespread in southern Australia but disappeared from there largely due to the drainage of the wetlands where the birds once bred. Due to their importance to Aboriginal people as a seasonal food source, as subjects of recreational hunting, and as a tourist attraction, their expansive and stable presence in northern Australia has been "ensured [by] protective management".

== Description ==
The magpie goose has black-and-white plumage in both sexes, with a long neck and legs and a long hooked bill. The males are 75–90 cm (30–35 in) in length and weigh 2.76 kg (6.1 lb) on average. The female is smaller, being 70–80 cm (28–31 in) in length and weighing 2.07 kg (4.6 lb). The wingspan of this bird spans 130–180 cm (4.3–5.9 ft). Their voice is a loud resonant honking. Its legs and feet are orange.

== Systematics and evolution ==
This species is placed in the order Anseriformes, having the characteristic bill structure, but is considered to be distinct from the other species in this taxon. The related and extant families, Anhimidae (screamers) and Anatidae (ducks, geese, and swans), contain all the other taxa. The magpie goose is contained in the genus Anseranas and family Anseranatidae, which are monotypic now.

A cladistic study of the morphology of waterfowl found that the magpie goose was an early and distinctive offshoot, diverging after screamers and before all other ducks, geese, and swans.

This family is quite old, a living fossil, having apparently diverged before the Cretaceous–Paleogene extinction event—the relative Vegavis iaai lived some 68–67 million years ago. The fossil record is limited, nonetheless. The enigmatic genus Anatalavis (Hornerstown Late Cretaceous or Early Paleocene of New Jersey, US - London Clay Early Eocene of Walton-on-the-Naze, England) is sometimes considered to be the earliest known. Other Paleogene birds sometimes considered magpie-geese are the genera Geranopsis from the Hordwell Formation Late Eocene to the Early Oligocene of England and Anserpica from the Late Oligocene of Billy-Créchy (France).

The earliest known member of the group in Australia is Eoanseranas represented by fossils found in the late Oligocene Carl Creek Limestone of Queensland. Additional fossils from North America and Europe suggest that the family was spread across the globe during the late Paleogene period.

== Ecology ==
Magpie Goose (captured on 8 June 2025. Bird Paradise, Singapore)

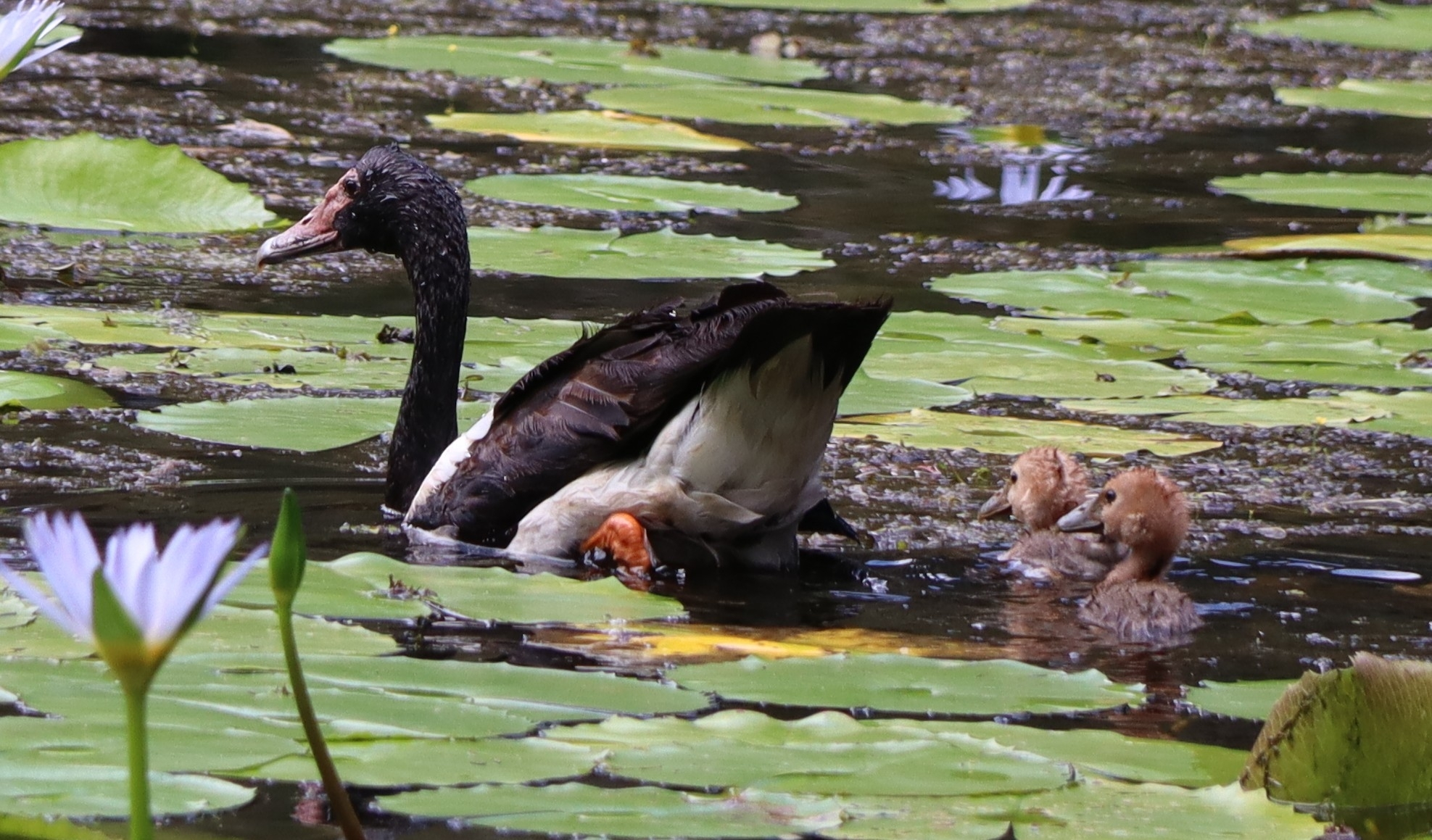
Magpie goose and goslings swimming through lily-covered water

The magpie goose is found in a variety of open wetland areas such as floodplains and swamps, where they wade and swim. They eat mostly vegetation such as dry grass blades, grass seeds, spike rush bulbs and wild rice.

Magpie geese are fairly sedentary apart from some movement during the dry season. They are colonial breeders and are gregarious outside of the breeding season when they can form large and noisy flocks of up to a few thousand individuals. Magpie geese nest on the ground or in trees where they can be five meters or higher above the ground. Their typical clutch is between five and nine eggs. Eggs measure 64–84 mm (2.5–3.3 in) in length and 46–63 mm (1.8–2.5 in) in width, weighing 76–138 g (2.7–4.9 oz). Often, males mate with two females, all of which raise the young, unlike some other polygamous birds.

== Status ==
This species is plentiful across its range, although this is significantly reduced in comparison to the range at time of European settlement. The range once extended as far south as the Coorong and the wetlands of the southeast of South Australia and Western Victoria. For Australia as a whole, it is not threatened and has a controlled hunting season when numbers are large. However, most of the southern populations were extirpated in the mid-20th century by overhunting and habitat destruction. The species has been subject to reintroduction projects such as Bool Lagoon between Penola and Naracoorte. Populations in more northern areas have again reached a level where it can be regularly utilized by hunters, although not in the example provided. The magpie goose was listed as near threatened on the 2007 advisory list of threatened vertebrate fauna in Victoria. In the December 2007 Flora and Fauna Guarantee Act list of threatened fauna, it is also listed. As of early 2008, an Action Statement for the recovery and future management of this species had not been prepared.

With the advent of climate change, and more frequent seawater inundations of the current extensive freshwater floodplains, CSIRO scientists argue that magpie geese populations may be at risk.

== In Aboriginal languages ==
The Kunwinjku of western Arnhem Land know this bird as manimunak. It became an important food item with the formation of wetlands about 1500 ya, and is depicted in rock art from this period. Mimi figures are often shown holding goose-feather fans. In Yolŋu Matha the bird is known as gurrumaṯtji, or around Ramingining as gumang.

In the Wadawurrung language, the magpie goose is known as Ngangok.

== Gallery ==
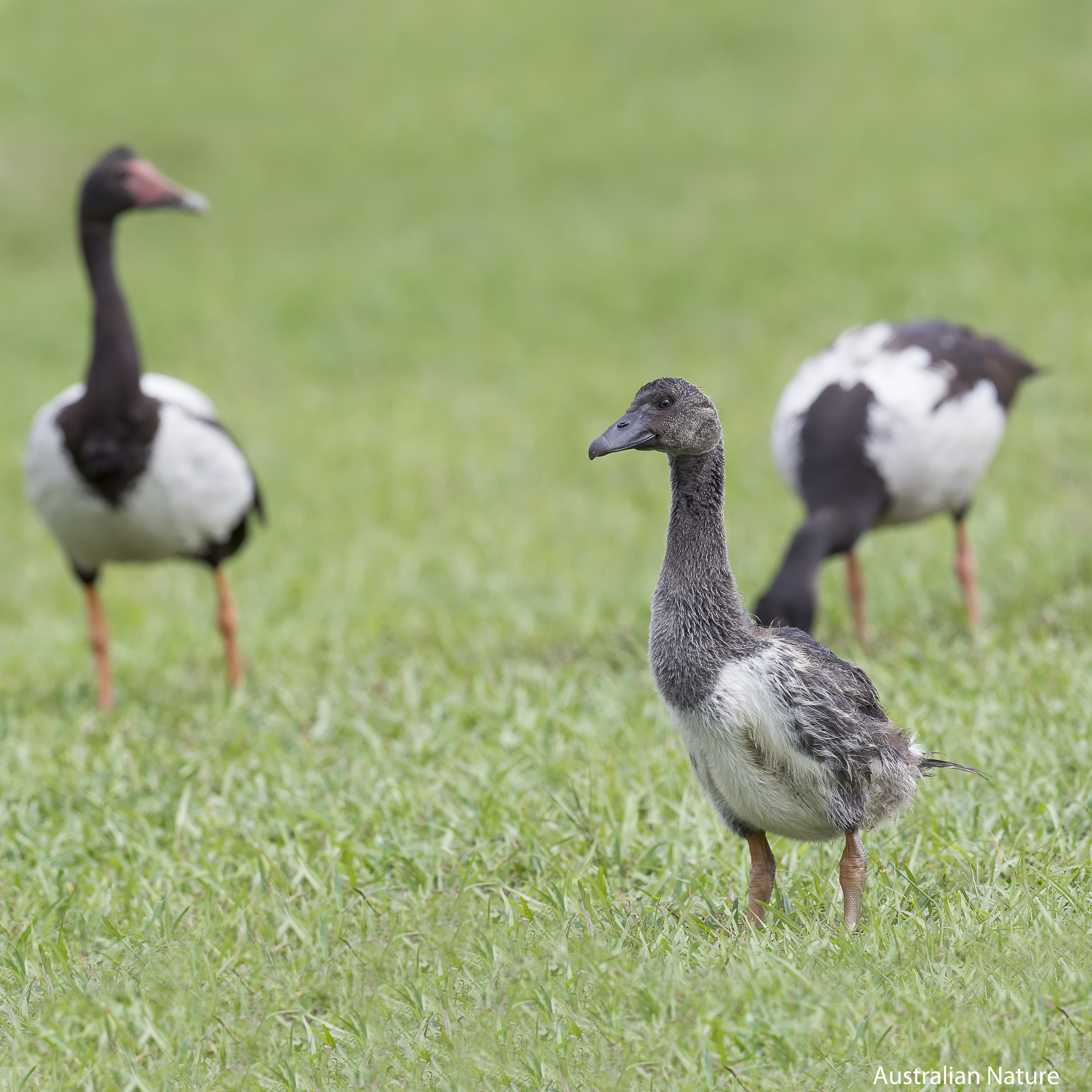
Juvenile

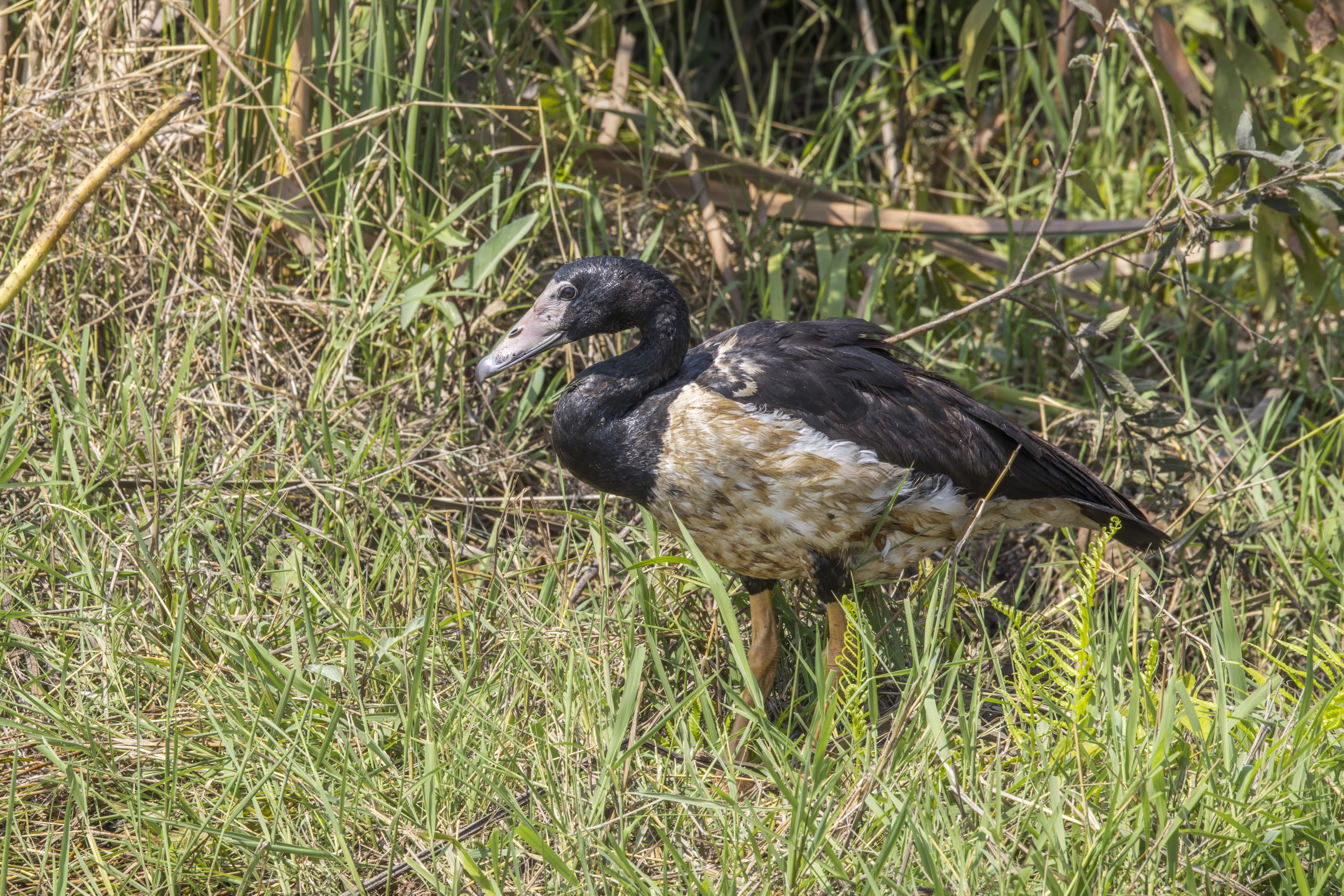
Immature

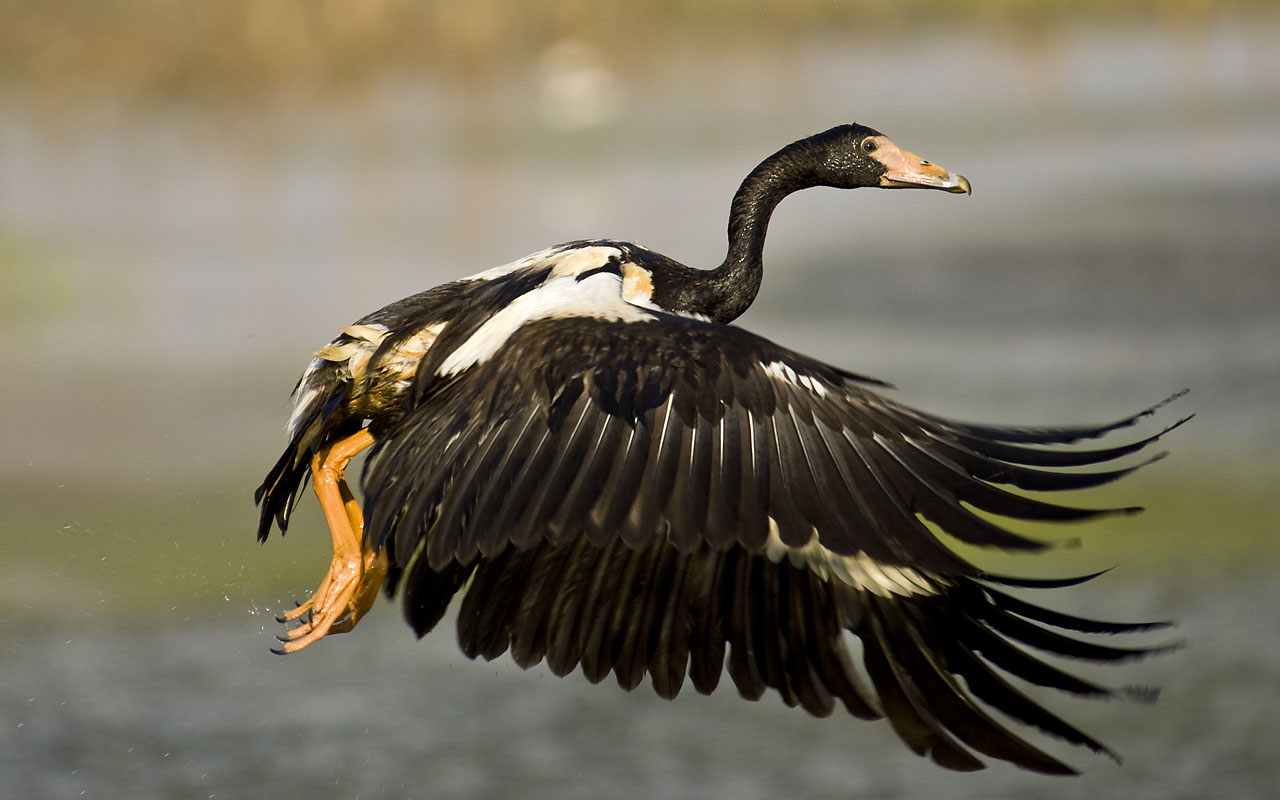
Taking off

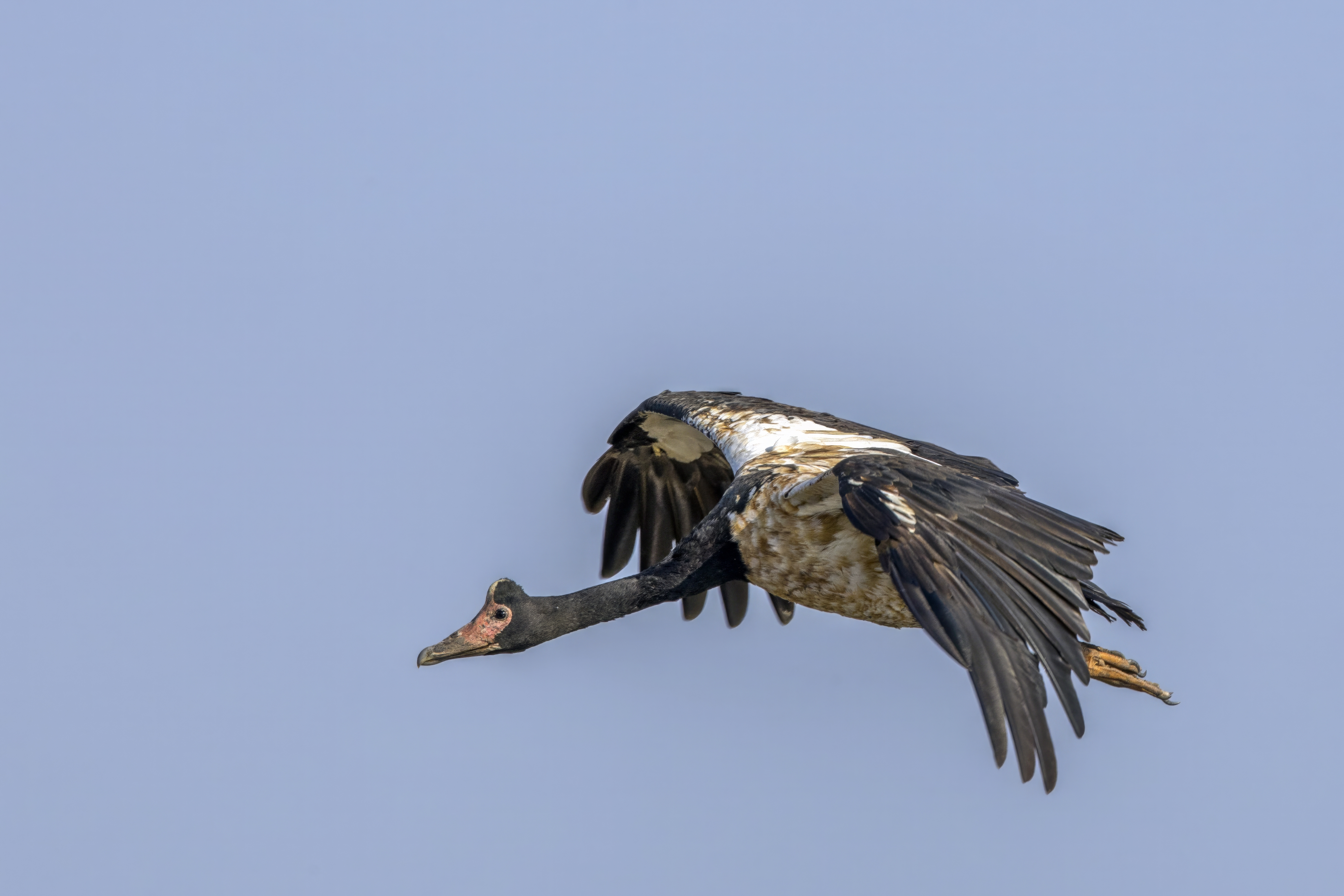
In flight

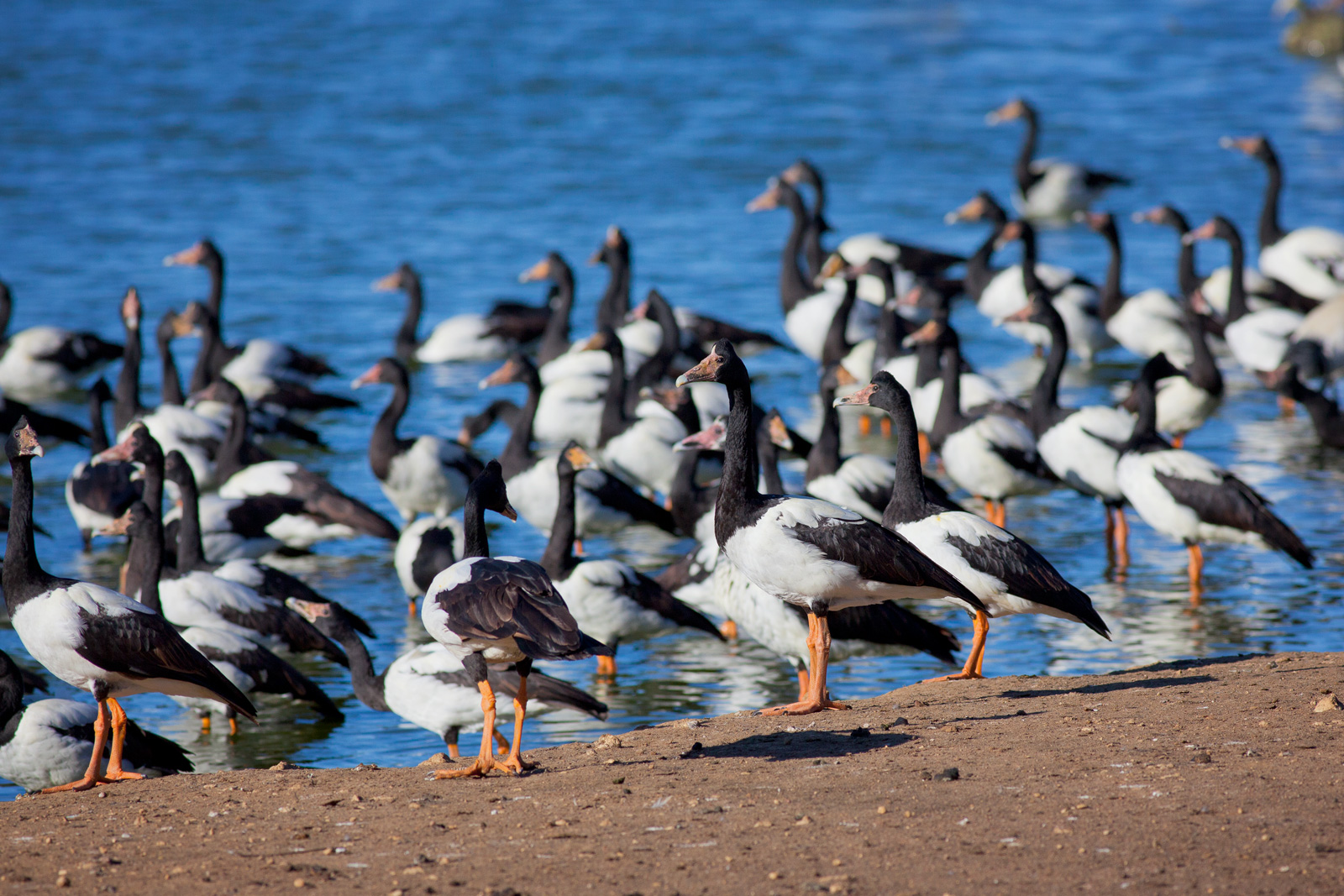
Magpie goose colony at Serendip Sanctuary

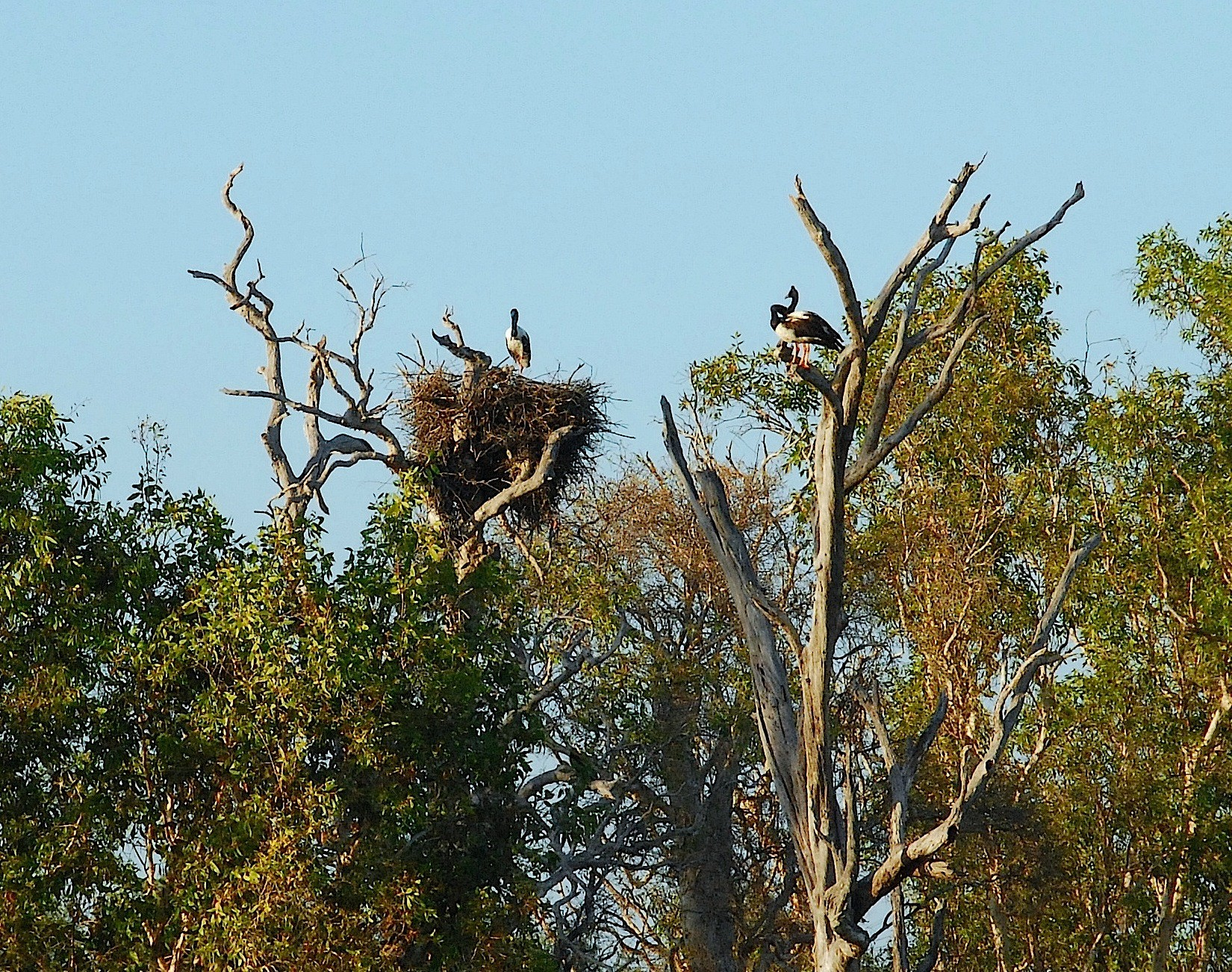
Magpie geese next to black-necked stork nest

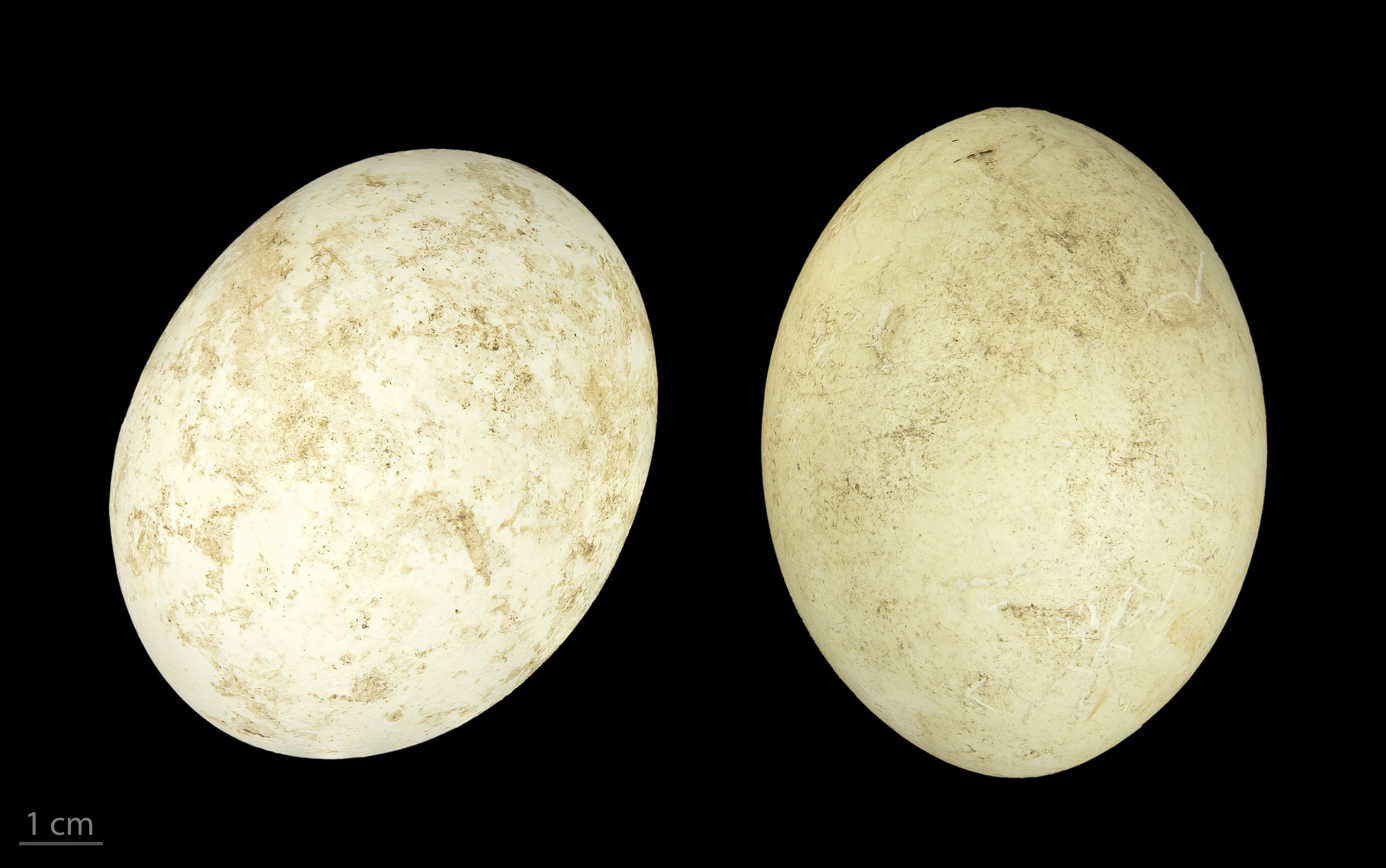
Eggs—MHNT

== See also ==
- Magpie duck
