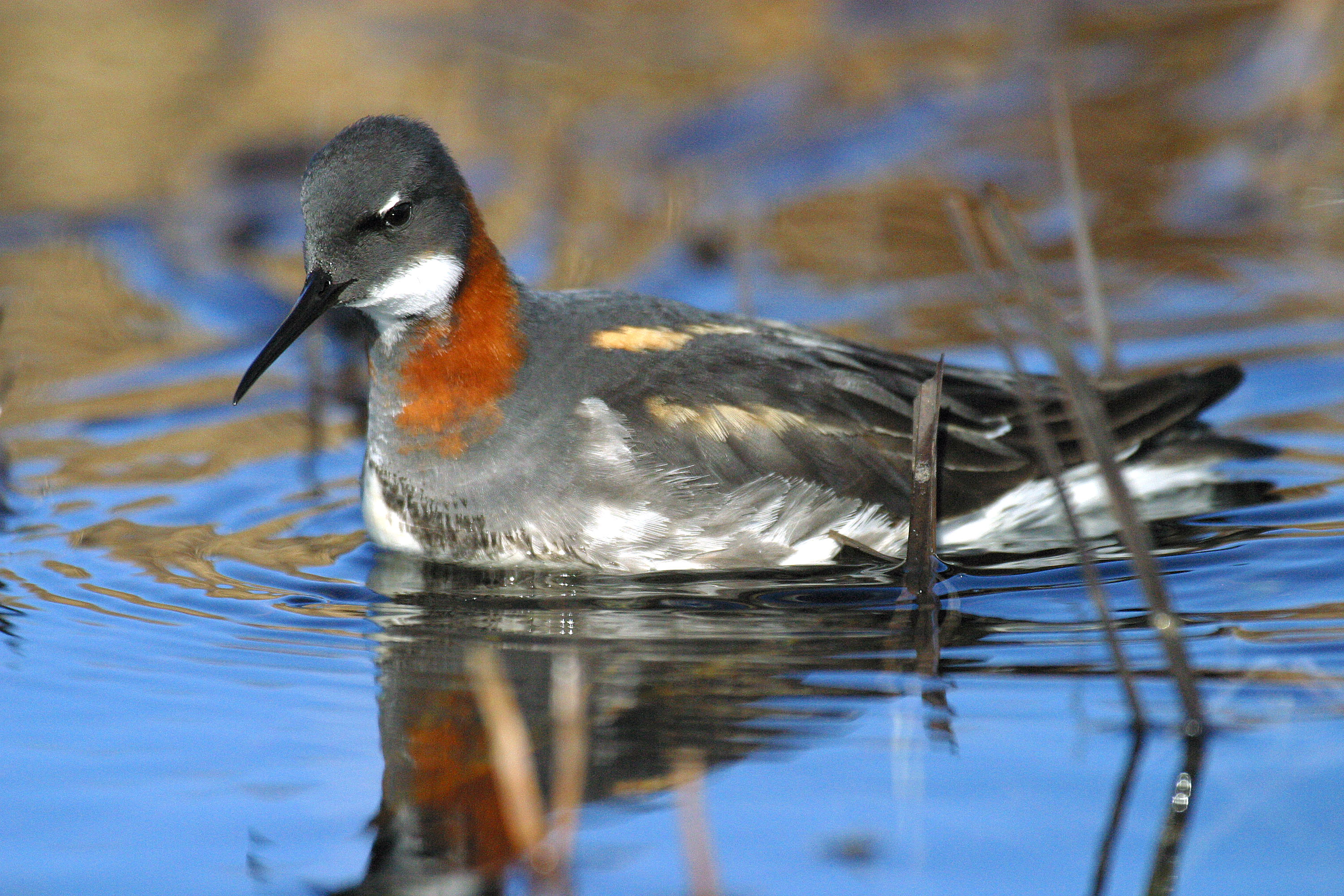
- Female red-necked phalarope (Phalaropus lobatus) in breeding plumage

Scientific classification
- Kingdom: Animalia
- Phylum: Chordata
- Class: Aves
- Order: Charadriiformes
- Family: Scolopacidae
- Genus: Phalaropus; Brisson, 1760

Type species
- Tringa fulicaria Linnaeus, 1758

Species
- Phalaropus fulicarius Phalaropus lobatus Phalaropus tricolor

Synonyms
- Steganopus

= Phalarope =

Genus of birds

A phalarope is any of three living species of slender-necked shorebirds in the genus Phalaropus of the bird family Scolopacidae.

Phalaropes are close relatives of the shanks and tattlers, the Actitis and Terek sandpipers, and also of the turnstones and calidrids. They are especially notable for their unusual nesting behavior and their unique feeding technique.

Two species, the red or grey phalarope (P. fulicarius) and the red-necked phalarope (P. lobatus) breed around the Arctic Circle and winter on tropical oceans. Wilson's phalarope (P. tricolor) breeds in western North America and migrates to South America. All are 15–25 cm (6–10 in) in length, with lobed toes and a straight, slender bill. Predominantly grey and white in winter, their plumage develops reddish markings in summer.

== Taxonomy ==
The genus Phalaropus was introduced by French zoologist Mathurin Jacques Brisson in 1760 with the red phalarope (Phalaropus fulicarius) as the type species. The English and genus names come through French phalarope and scientific Latin Phalaropus from Ancient Greek φαλαρίς (phalarís), meaning "coot", and πούς (poús), meaning "foot". Coots and phalaropes both have lobed toes.

The genus contains three species:

Genus Phalaropus – Brisson, 1760 – three species
Common name	Scientific name and subspecies	Range	Size and ecology	IUCN status and estimated population (Note: Estimated number of mature individuals and population trends as provided by the International Union for Conservation of Nature.)
Wilson's phalarope Breeding plumage Non-Breeding plumage	Phalaropus tricolor (Vieillot, 1819)	North America in western Canada and the western United States.	Size: 22–24 cm (8.7–9.4 in) long, 39–43 cm (15–17 in) wingspan Habitat: Diet:	LC 1,500,000
Red-necked phalarope Breeding plumage Non-Breeding plumage	Phalaropus lobatus (Linnaeus, 1758)	Arctic regions of North America and Eurasia.	Size: 18–19 cm (7.1–7.5 in) long, 31–34 cm (12–13 in) wingspan Habitat: Diet:	LC
Red phalarope Breeding plumage Non-Breeding plumage	Phalaropus fulicarius (Linnaeus, 1758)	Arctic regions of North America and Eurasia.	Size: 20–21 cm (7.9–8.1 in) long, 41–44 cm (16.1–17.3 in) wingspan Habitat: Diet:	LC 9,000,000–12,000,000

A fossil species, P. elenorae, is known from the Middle Pliocene 4–3 million years ago (Mya). A coracoid fragment from the Late Oligocene (23 Mya) near Créchy, France, was also ascribed to a primitive phalarope; it might belong to an early species of the present genus or a prehistoric relative. The divergence of phalaropes from their closest relatives can be dated to around that time, as evidenced by the fossil record (chiefly of the shanks) and supported by tentative DNA sequence data. Of note, the last remains of the Turgai Sea disappeared around then, and given the distribution of their fossil species, this process probably played a major role in separating the lineages of the shank-phalarope clade.

== Ecology and behavior ==
Red and red-necked phalaropes are unusual amongst shorebirds in that they are considered pelagic, that is, they spend a great deal of their lives outside the breeding season well out to sea. Phalaropes are unusually halophilic (salt-loving) and feed in great numbers in saline lakes such as Mono Lake in California and the Great Salt Lake of Utah.

=== Feeding ===
When feeding, a phalarope often swims in a small, rapid circle, forming a small whirlpool. This behavior is thought to aid feeding by raising food from the bottom of shallow water. The bird then reaches into the center of the vortex with its bill, plucking small insects or crustaceans caught up therein. Phalaropes use the surface tension of water to capture food particles and get them to move up along their bills and into their mouths in what has been termed as a capillary ratchet.

=== Sexual dimorphism and reproduction ===
In the three phalarope species, sexual dimorphism and contributions to parenting are reversed from what is normally seen in birds. Females are larger and more brightly colored than males. The females pursue and fight over males, then defend them from other females until the male begins incubation of the clutch. Males perform all incubation and chick care, while the female attempts to find another male to mate with. If a male loses his eggs to predation, he often rejoins his original mate or a new female, which then lays another clutch. When the season is too late to start new nests, females begin their southward migration, leaving the males to incubate the eggs and care for the young. Phalaropes are uncommon among birds and vertebrates in general in that they engage in polyandry, with one female taking multiple male mates, while males mate with only one female. Specifically, phalaropes engage in serial polyandry, wherein females pair with multiple males at different times in the breeding season.

== See also ==
- Eurasian dotterel, a species in which the male also incubates the eggs and rears the young
- Too Late the Phalarope, a novel by South African author Alan Paton
