= Château de Billy =

Castle in Auvergne-Rhône-Alpes, France

Coordinates: 46°14′12″N 3°25′43″E

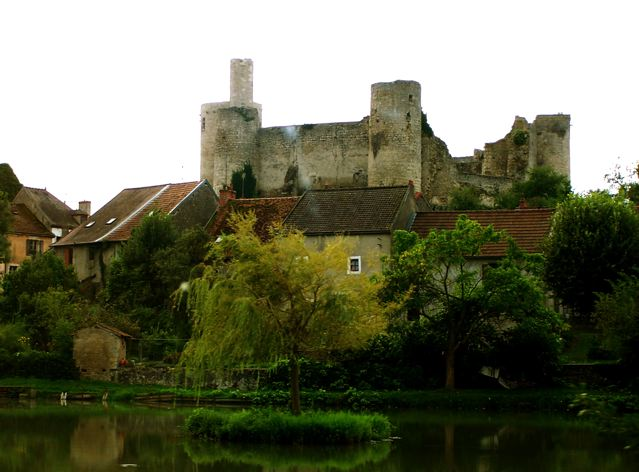
The Château de Billy overlooks the town of Billy.

The Château de Billy is a ruined 13th – 14th century castle in the town of Billy in the Allier département of France.

== History ==
For the first several centuries of its existence, the Château de Billy was the property of its builders, the Bourbons. The fortified town of Billy and the province of Bourbonnais were part of the domain of the lordship of the Bourbons. Both the castle and the lordship remained powerful until the French Revolution (1789).

== Architecture ==
The main fortification has an ovoid layout with a hexagonal watchtower which dominates the houses of the town and the medieval streets that curve around the walls of the castle. An imposing châtelet guards the entrance. The southern curtain wall has a walkway that offers a splendid panorama of the Allier valley.

The castle is privately owned and open to the public. It has been listed since 1921 as a monument historique by the French Ministry of Culture.

== See also ==
- List of castles in France
