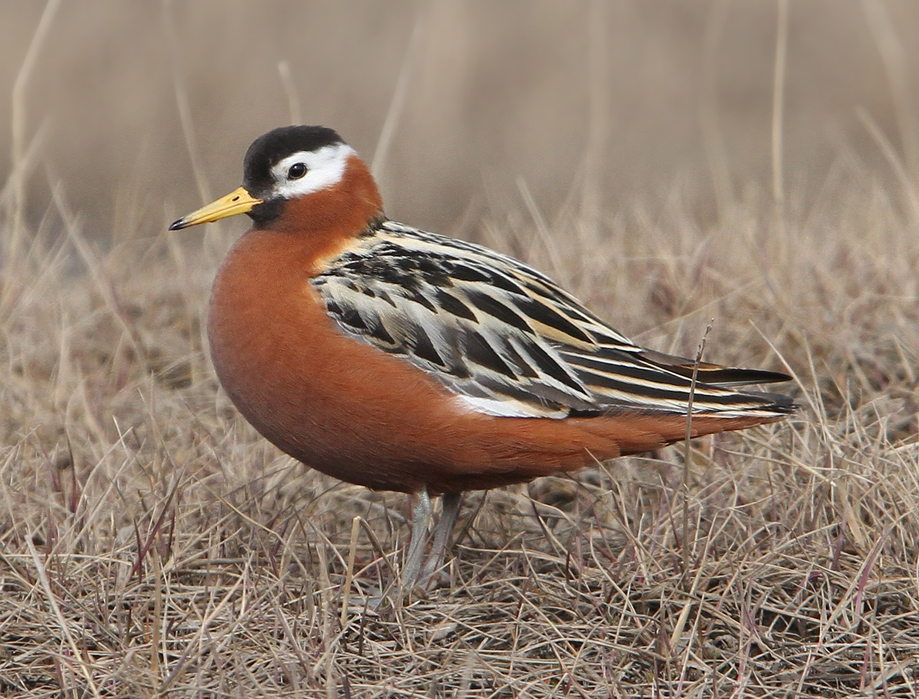
- female in breeding plumage
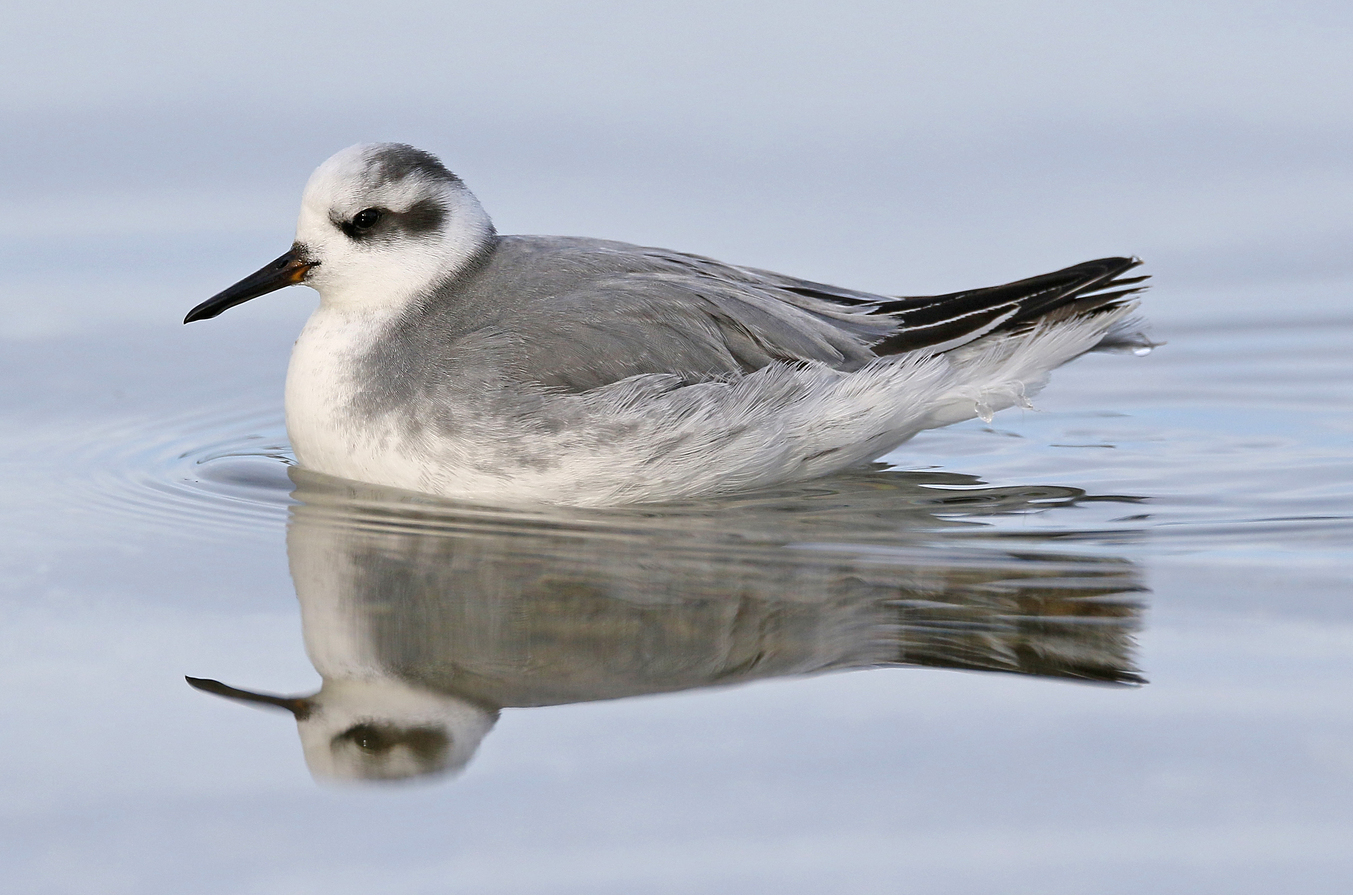
- Adult in nonbreeding plumage

Conservation status
- Least Concern (IUCN 3.1)

Scientific classification
- Kingdom: Animalia
- Phylum: Chordata
- Class: Aves
- Order: Charadriiformes
- Family: Scolopacidae
- Genus: Phalaropus
- Species: P. fulicarius

Binomial name
- Phalaropus fulicarius (Linnaeus, 1758)
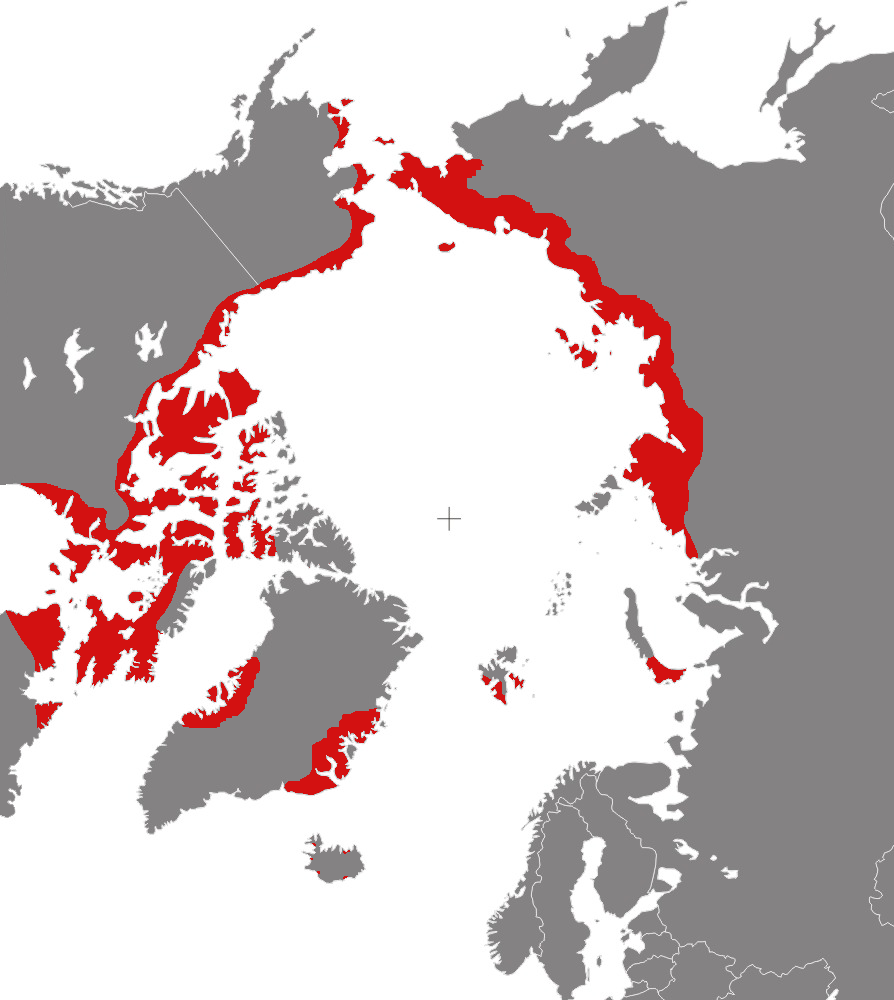
- Breeding distribution
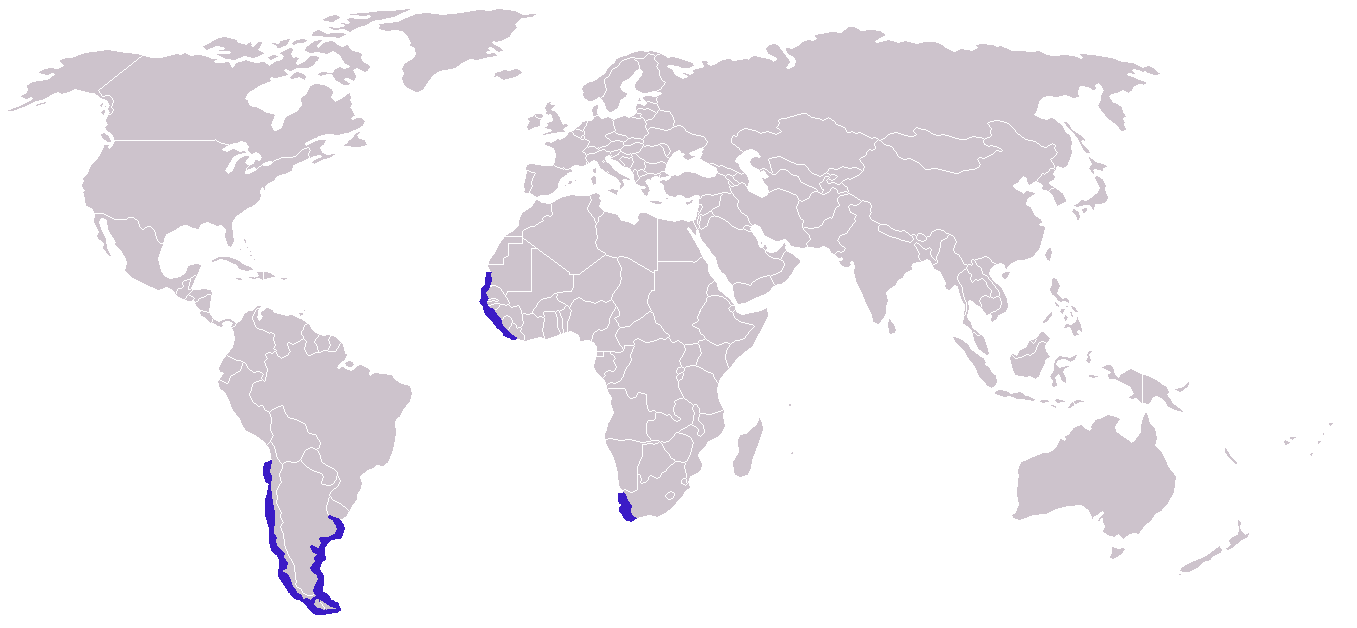
- Wintering range

Synonyms
- Tringa fulicaria Linnaeus, 1758; Crymophilus fulicarius (Linnaeus, 1758); Phalaropus fulicaria (lapsus)

= Red phalarope =

Species of bird

The red phalarope or grey phalarope (Phalaropus fulicarius) is a small wader. This phalarope breeds in the Arctic regions of North America and Eurasia. It is migratory, and, unusually for a wader, migrates mainly on oceanic routes, wintering at sea on tropical oceans.

== Taxonomy ==
In 1750, the English naturalist George Edwards included an illustration and a description of the red phalarope in the third volume of his A Natural History of Uncommon Birds. He used the English name "The Red-footed Tringa". Edwards based his hand-coloured etching on a preserved specimen that had been brought to London from the Hudson Bay area of Canada by James Isham. When the Swedish naturalist Carl Linnaeus updated his Systema Naturae for the tenth edition in 1758, he included the red phalarope and placed it with phalaropes and sandpipers in the genus Tringa. Linnaeus included a brief description, coined the binomial name Tringa fulicaria and cited Edwards' work. The red phalarope is now one of three species placed in the genus Phalaropus that was introduced in 1760 by the French zoologist Mathurin Jacques Brisson. The species is monotypic: no subspecies are recognised.

The English and genus names for phalaropes come through French phalarope and scientific Latin Phalaropus from Ancient Greek phalaris, "coot", and pous, "foot". The specific fulicarius is from Latin fulica, "coot". Coots and phalaropes both have lobed toes.

== Description ==
Red phalarope in nonbreeding plumage 2009 in Ystad.

The red phalarope is about 21 cm (8.3 in) in length, with lobed toes and a straight bill, somewhat thicker than that of red-necked phalarope. The breeding female is predominantly dark brown and black above, with red underparts and white cheek patches. The bill is yellow, tipped black. The breeding male is a duller version of the female. Young birds are light grey and brown above, with buff underparts and a dark patch through the eye. In winter, the plumage is essentially grey above and white below, but the black eyepatch is always present. The bill is black in winter. Their call is a short beek.

Standard Measurements
length	200–230 mm (7.7–9 in)
weight	55 g (1.9 oz)
wingspan	430 mm (17 in)
wing	121–132 mm (4.8–5.2 in)
tail	58.5–67.1 mm (2.30–2.64 in)
culmen	21–23 mm (0.83–0.91 in)
tarsus	21.8–23 mm (0.86–0.91 in)

== Breeding ==
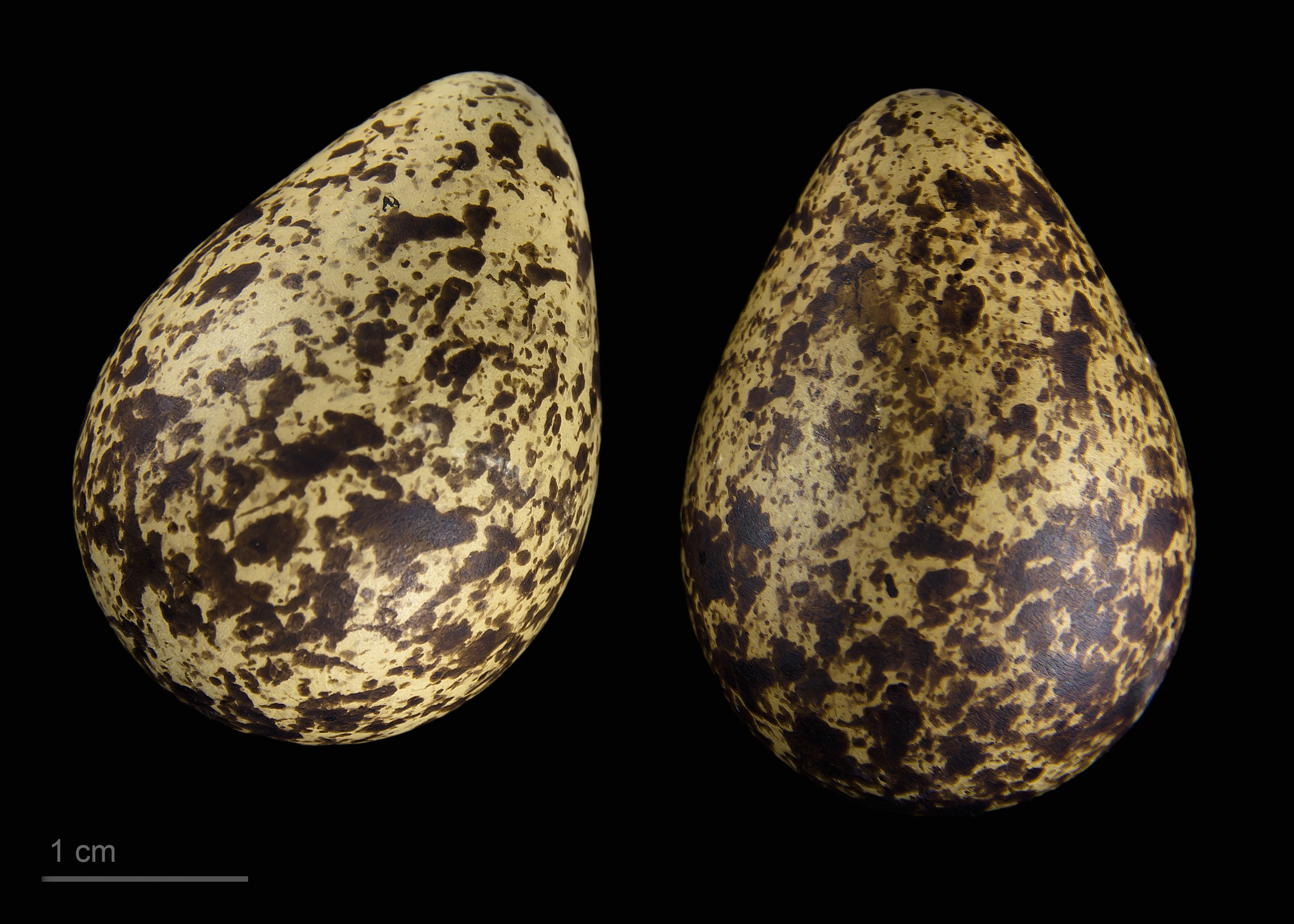
Phalaropus fulicarius - MHNT

The typical avian sex roles are reversed in the three phalarope species. Females are larger and more brightly coloured than males. The females pursue males, compete for nesting territory, and will aggressively defend their nests and chosen mates. Once the females lay their olive-brown eggs, they begin their southward migration, leaving the males to incubate the eggs and care for the young. Three to six eggs are laid in a ground nest near water. Incubation lasts 18 or 19 days. The young mainly feed themselves and are able to fly within 18 days of birth.

== Behaviour ==
When feeding, a red phalarope will often swim in a small, rapid circle, forming a small whirlpool. This behaviour is thought to aid feeding by raising food from the bottom of shallow water. The bird will reach into the outskirts of the vortex with its bill, plucking small insects or crustaceans caught up therein. They sometimes fly up to catch insects in flight. Chicks feed mainly on Diptera, including Chironomidae, Tipulidae, Empididae, Trichoceridae and Culicidae. On the open ocean, they are found in areas where converging ocean currents produce upwellings and are often found near groups of whales. Outside of the nesting season they often travel in flocks.This species is often very tame and approachable.

== Status and conservation ==
The red phalarope is one of the species to which the Agreement on the Conservation of African-Eurasian Migratory Waterbirds (AEWA) applies.
