= Eoanseranas =

Eoanseranas handae Temporal range: Late Oligocene to Early Miocene, 26–23 Ma

Scientific classification
- Kingdom: Animalia
- Phylum: Chordata
- Class: Aves
- Order: Anseriformes
- Family: Anseranatidae
- Genus: †Eoanseranas; Worthy & Scanlon, 2009
- Species: †E. handae

Binomial name
- †Eoanseranas handae Worthy & Scanlon, 2009

Extinct genus of birds

Eoanseranas handae, also sometimes referred to as Hand's dawn magpie goose, is an extinct genus and species of bird. Allied to the family Anseranatidae, which are represented by modern magpie geese, it existed during the Late Oligocene or Early Miocene of northern Australia. It was described from fossil material (a left coracoid and two left scapulae) found at a Carl Creek Limestone site at Riversleigh, in the Boodjamulla National Park of northwestern Queensland. It was slightly smaller than its perceived descendant, the extant magpie goose Anseranas semipalmata.

The generic name comes from the Greek eos ("dawn") and Anseranas, for the apparent ancestral connection to the modern species Anseranas semipalmata. The specific epithet honours Australian palaeontologist Suzanne Hand, a prominent researcher of the fossil faunas of Riversleigh.
