= Billy, Allier =

Billy
- Commune
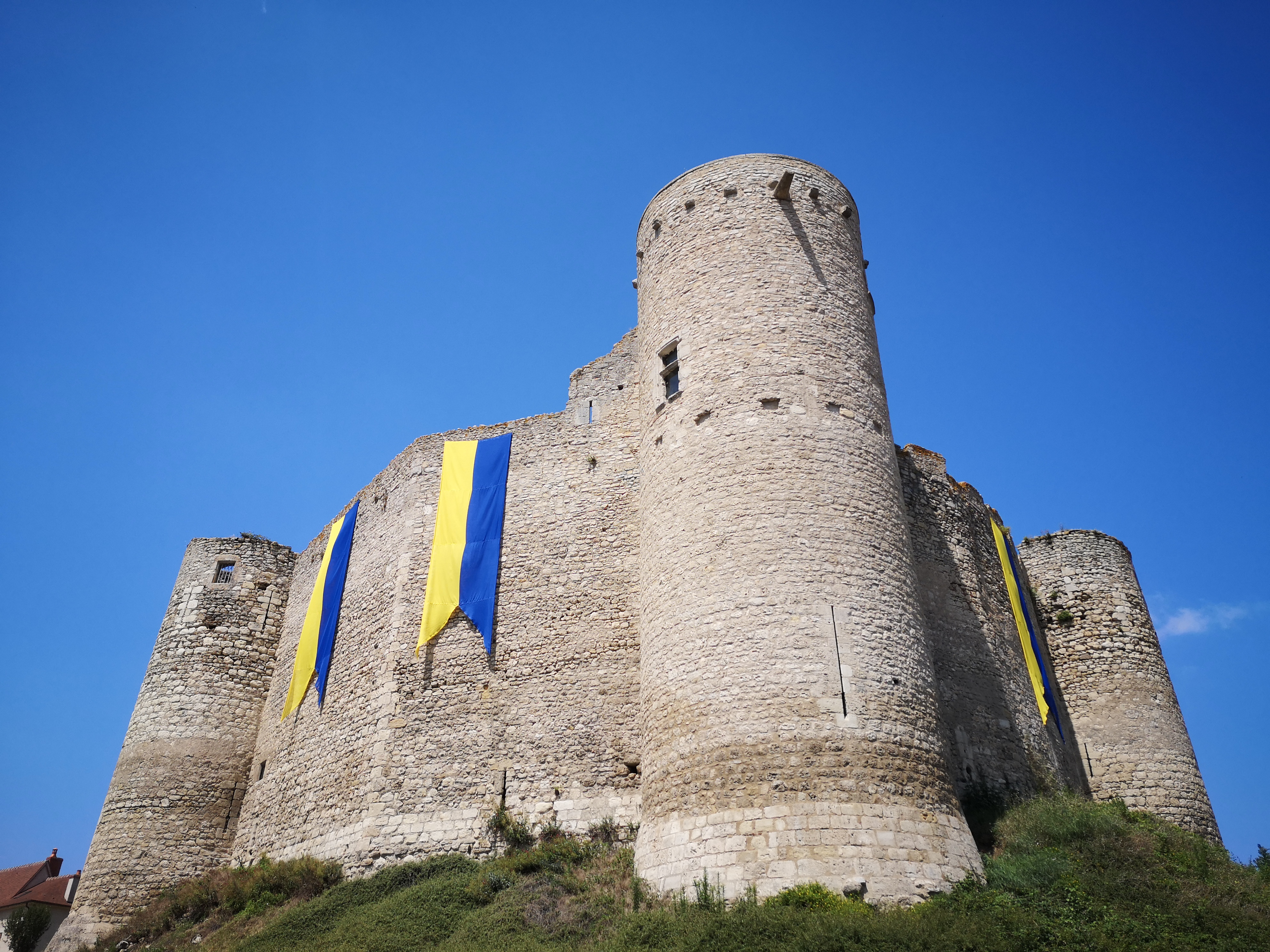
- Castle.

- Coat of arms
- Location of Billy
- Location within France Location within Auvergne-Rhône-Alpes
- Coordinates: 46°14′14″N 3°25′48″E
- Country: France
- Region: Auvergne-Rhône-Alpes
- Department: Allier
- Arrondissement: Vichy
- Canton: Saint-Pourçain-sur-Sioule
- Intercommunality: CA Vichy Communauté

Government
  - Mayor (2026–32): Jean-Louis Boudonnat
- Area^{1}: 10.22 km^{2} (3.95 sq mi)
- Elevation: 220 m (720 ft)
- Highest elevation: 375 m (1,230 ft)
- Lowest elevation: 235 m (771 ft)
- Population (2023): 817
  - Density: 79.9/km^{2} (207/sq mi)
- Time zone: UTC+01:00 (CET)
  - Summer (DST): UTC+02:00 (CEST)
- INSEE/Postal code: 03029 /03260
- Website: intramuros.org/billy
- ^{1} French Land Register data, which excludes lakes, ponds, glaciers > 1 km^{2} (0.386 sq mi or 247 acres) and river estuaries.

Billy (French pronunciation: [biji]; Occitan: Bilhi) is a commune in the Allier department in central France.

== Geography ==
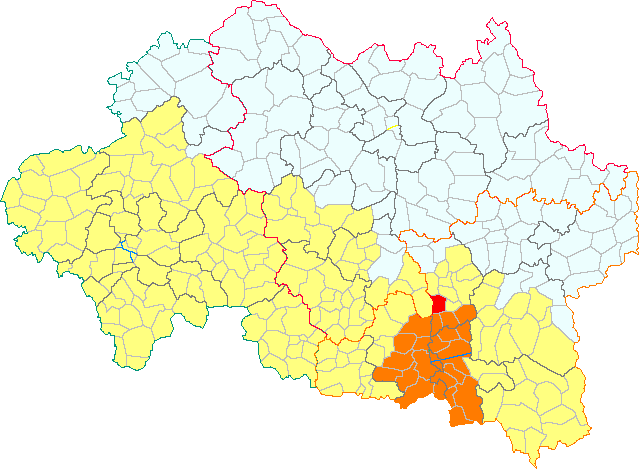
Billy in the former agglomeration community of Vichy Val d'Allier.

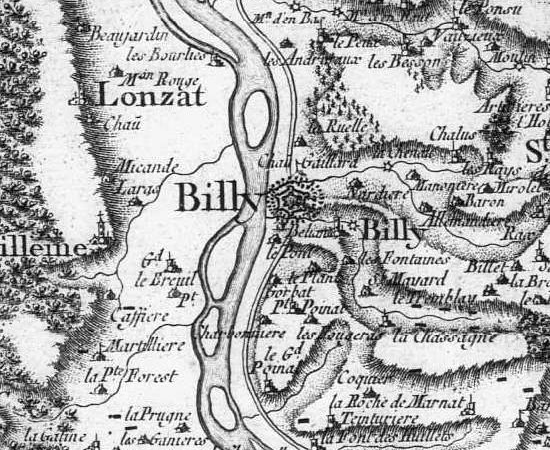
Billy on the map of Cassini.

== History ==
Between this village and nearby Créchy, lagerstätten have yielded a rich assemblage of fossils from the Oligocene-Miocene boundary (c. 24-23 million years ago).

== Population ==
Historical population
Year	Pop.	±% p.a.
1968	1,084	—
1975	912	−2.44%
1982	921	+0.14%
1990	1,007	+1.12%
1999	929	−0.89%
2007	847	−1.15%
2012	838	−0.21%
2017	781	−1.40%
2023	817	+0.75%
Source: INSEE

== See also ==
- Communes of the Allier department
