= Créchy =

- Commune
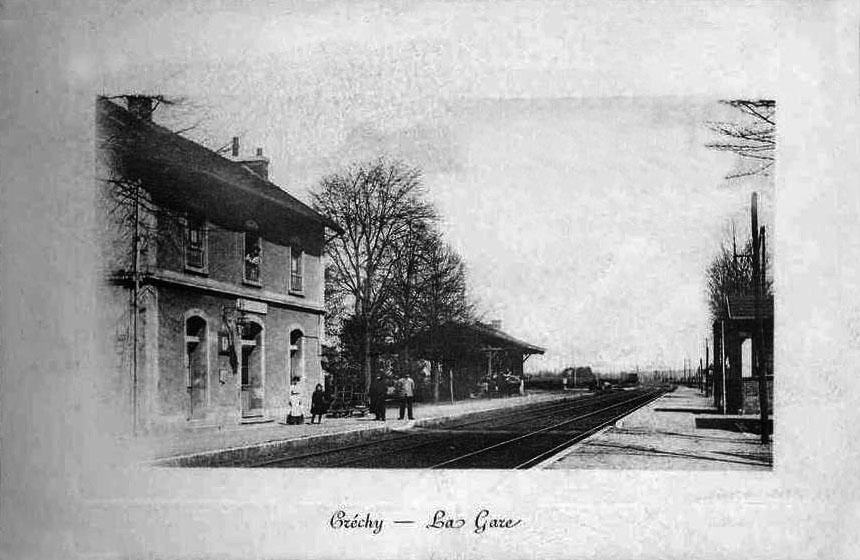
- The railway station in the early 20th century

- Coat of arms
- Location of Créchy
- Location within France Location within Auvergne-Rhône-Alpes
- Coordinates: 46°15′44″N 3°25′27″E
- Country: France
- Region: Auvergne-Rhône-Alpes
- Department: Allier
- Arrondissement: Vichy
- Canton: Saint-Pourçain-sur-Sioule
- Intercommunality: Entr'Allier Besbre et Loire

Government
  - Mayor (2026–32): Claude Blanc
- Area^{1}: 11.61 km^{2} (4.48 sq mi)
- Elevation: 232 m (761 ft)
- Highest elevation: 344 m (1,129 ft)
- Lowest elevation: 233 m (764 ft)
- Population (2023): 428
  - Density: 36.9/km^{2} (95.5/sq mi)
- Time zone: UTC+01:00 (CET)
  - Summer (DST): UTC+02:00 (CEST)
- INSEE/Postal code: 03091 /03150
- ^{1} French Land Register data, which excludes lakes, ponds, glaciers > 1 km^{2} (0.386 sq mi or 247 acres) and river estuaries.

Créchy (French pronunciation: [kʁeʃi]; Occitan: Creschic) is a commune in the Allier department in central France.

Between this village and nearby Billy, lagerstätten have yielded a rich assemblage of fossils from the Oligocene-Miocene boundary (c. 24-23 million years ago).

== Population ==
Historical population
Year	Pop.	±% p.a.
1968	440	—
1975	331	−3.98%
1982	425	+3.64%
1990	481	+1.56%
1999	442	−0.94%
2007	466	+0.66%
2012	486	+0.84%
2017	455	−1.31%
2023	428	−1.01%
Source: INSEE

== See also ==
- Communes of the Allier department
