= Wilsonia =

Wilsonia may refer to:

- Wilsonia (bird), a genus of birds
- Wilsonia (plant), a genus of plants
- Estevia, an extinct genus of ants previously known as Wilsonia
- Wilsonia, California, a census-designated place
- Wilsonia Historic District, an historic district in California
