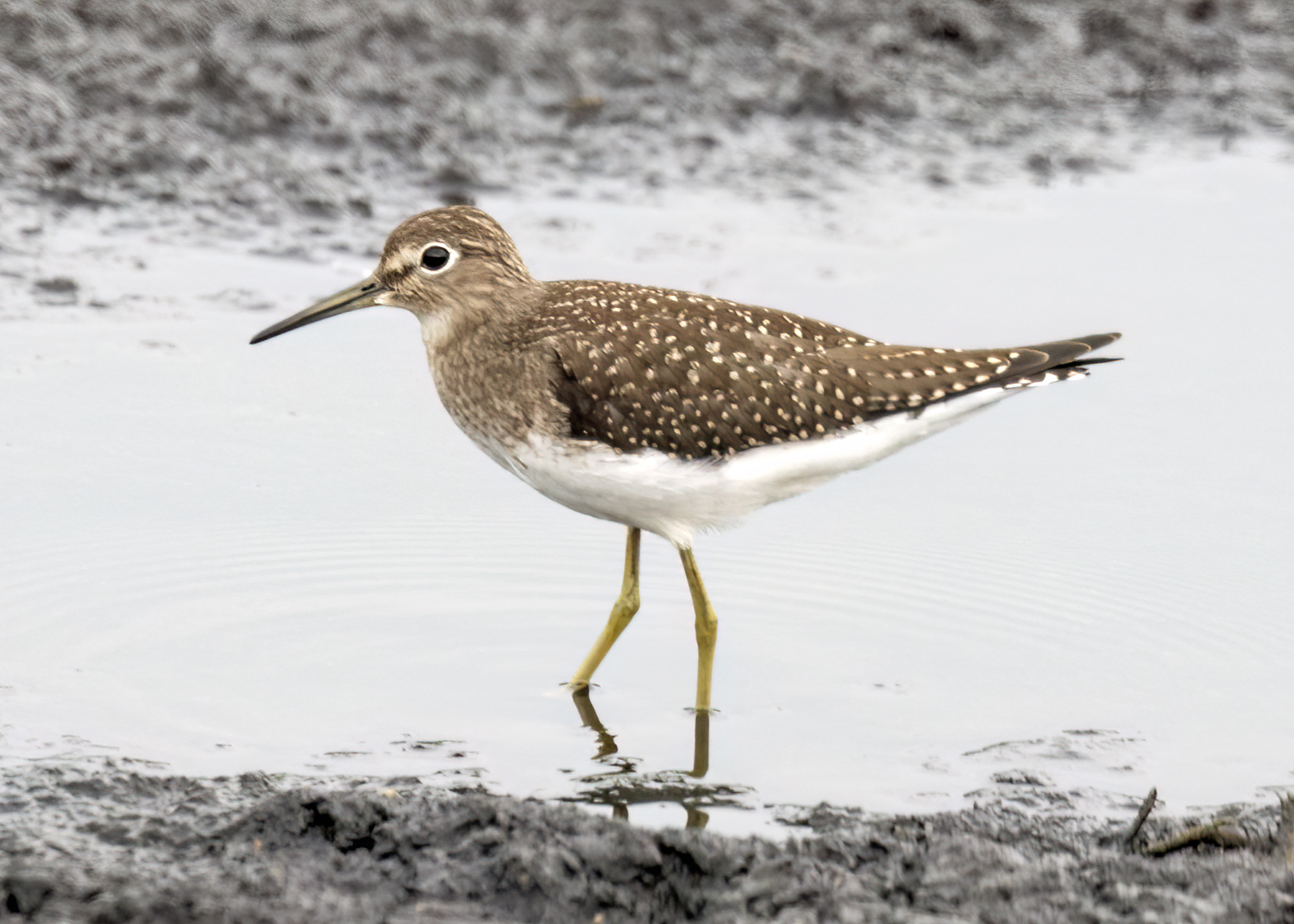

Conservation status
- Least Concern (IUCN 3.1)

Scientific classification
- Kingdom: Animalia
- Phylum: Chordata
- Class: Aves
- Order: Charadriiformes
- Family: Scolopacidae
- Genus: Tringa
- Species: T. solitaria

Binomial name
- Tringa solitaria Wilson, 1813

Synonyms
- Helodromas solitarius

= Solitary sandpiper =

Species of bird

The solitary sandpiper (Tringa solitaria) is a small shorebird. The genus name Tringa is the Neo-Latin name given to the green sandpiper by Aldrovandus in 1599 based on Ancient Greek trungas, a thrush-sized, white-rumped, tail-bobbing wading bird mentioned by Aristotle. The specific solitaria is Latin for "solitary" from solus, "alone".

== Description ==
This species measures 18–23 cm (7.1–9.1 in) long, with a wingspan up to 50 cm (20 in) and a body mass of 31–65 g (1.1–2.3 oz). It is a dumpy wader with a dark green back, greyish head and breast and otherwise white underparts. It is obvious in flight, with wings dark above and below, and a dark rump and tail centre. The latter feature distinguishes it from the slightly larger and broader-winged, but otherwise very similar, green sandpiper (T. ochropus) of Europe and Asia, to which it is closely related. The latter species has a brilliant white rump. In flight, the solitary sandpiper has a characteristic three-note whistle. They both have brown wings with little light dots, and a delicate but contrasting neck and chest pattern. In addition, both species nest in trees, unlike most other scolopacids.

== Distribution and habitat ==
It breeds in woodlands across Alaska and Canada. It is a migratory bird, wintering in Central and South America, especially in the Amazon River basin, and the Caribbean. It is a very rare vagrant to western Europe in summer and fall.

=== Subspecies ===
The solitary sandpiper is split into two subspecies:

- T. s. cinnamomea, (Brewster, 1890): breeds in Alaska & western Canada
- T. s. solitaria, (Wilson, 1813): breeds from eastern British Columbia to Labrador

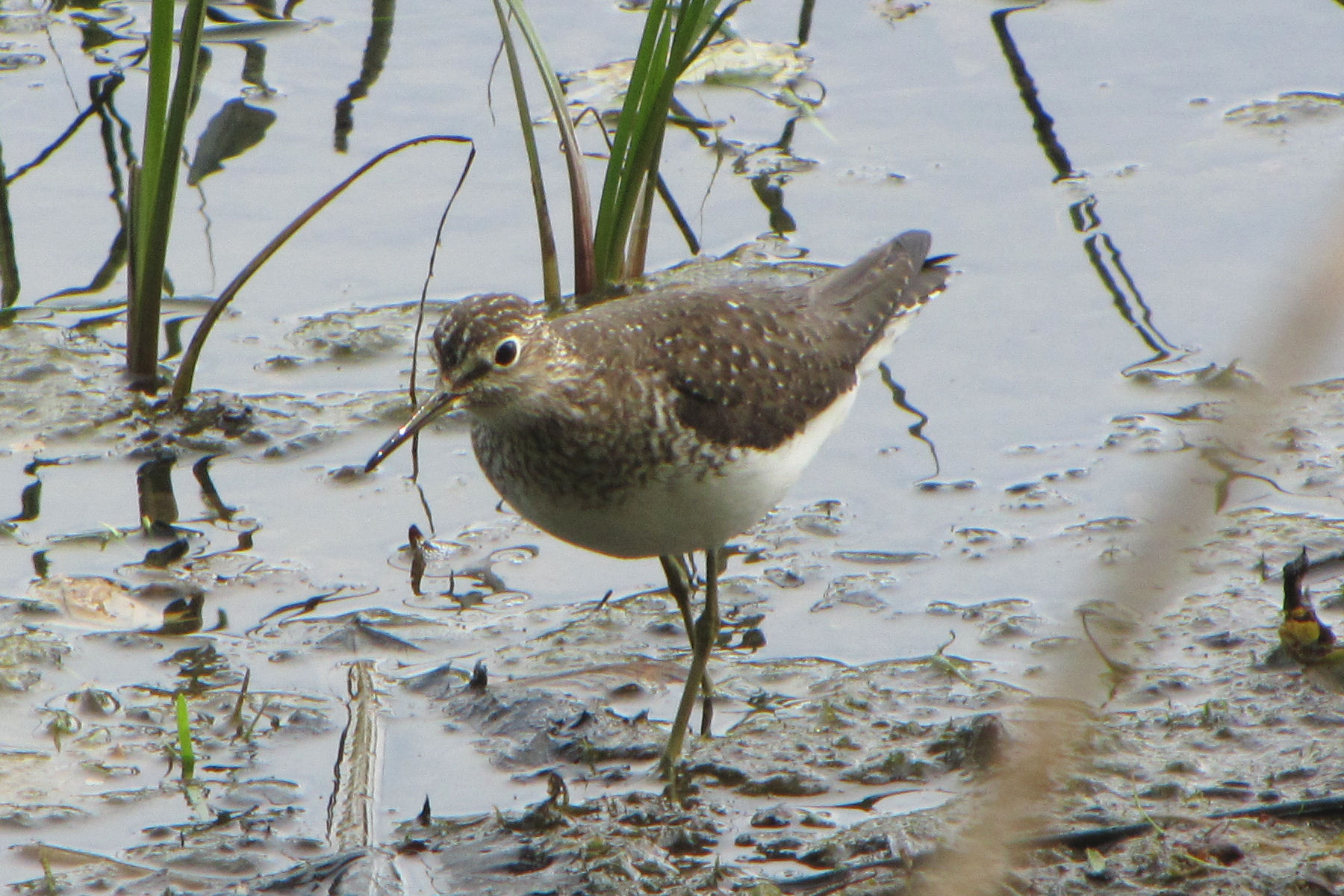
Hunting behaviour

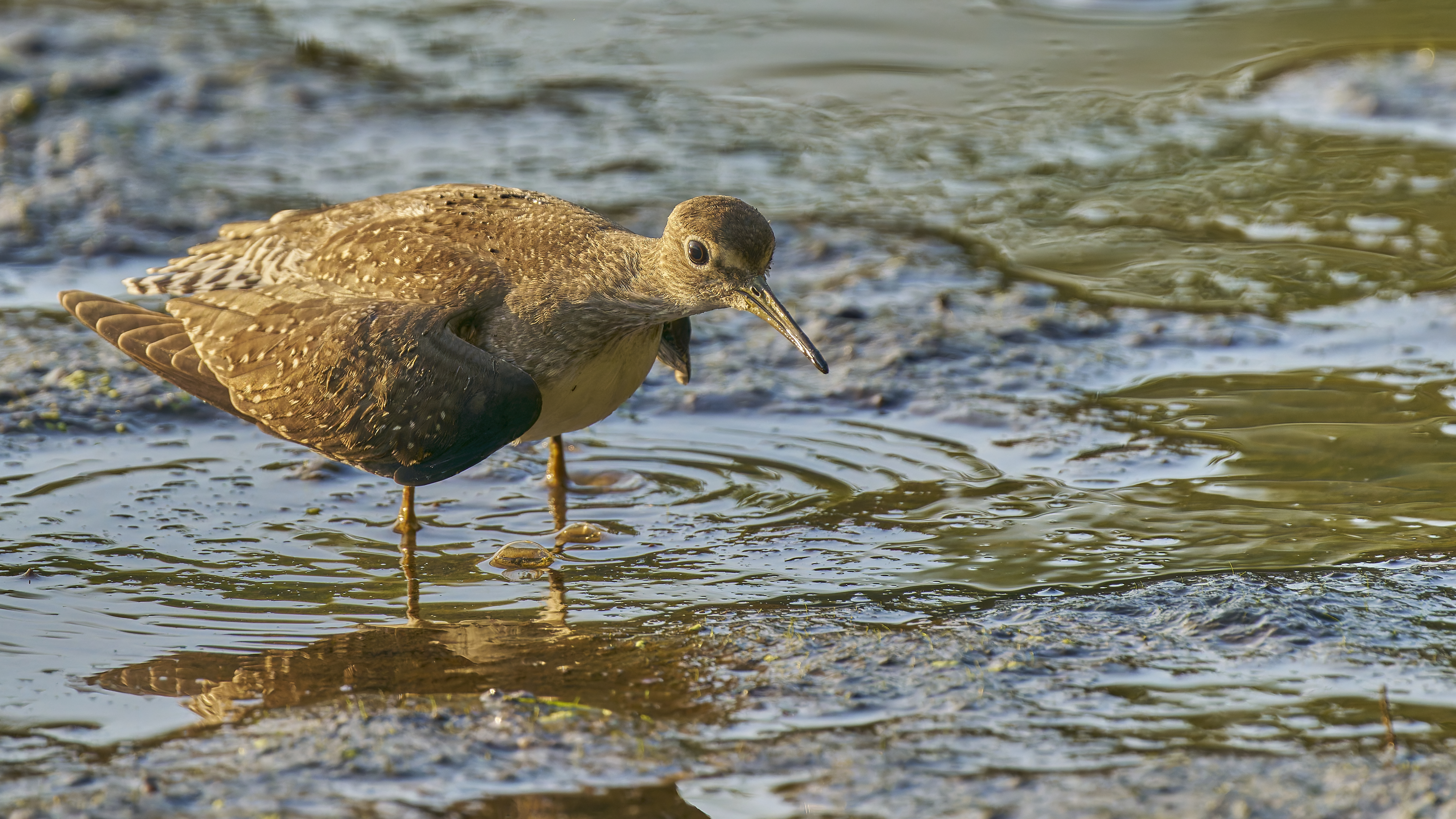
Foraging on a mud-flat

Video of feeding behavior

== Behaviour ==
As its name indicates, the solitary sandpiper is not a gregarious species, usually seen alone during migration, although sometimes small numbers congregate in suitable feeding areas. The solitary sandpiper is very much a bird of fresh water, and is often found in sites, such as ditches, too restricted for other waders, which tend to like a clear all-round view.

=== Breeding ===
The sandpiper lays a clutch of 3–5 eggs in abandoned tree nests of songbird species, such as those of thrushes. The young birds are encouraged to drop to the ground soon after hatching.

=== Feeding ===
Food is small invertebrates: insects (such as mosquito larvae, young midges, grasshoppers, caterpillars and beetles), small crustaceans and molluscs (such as snails extracted from their shells), sometimes small frogs (primarily as tadpoles), picked off the mud as the bird works steadily around the edges of its chosen pond.
