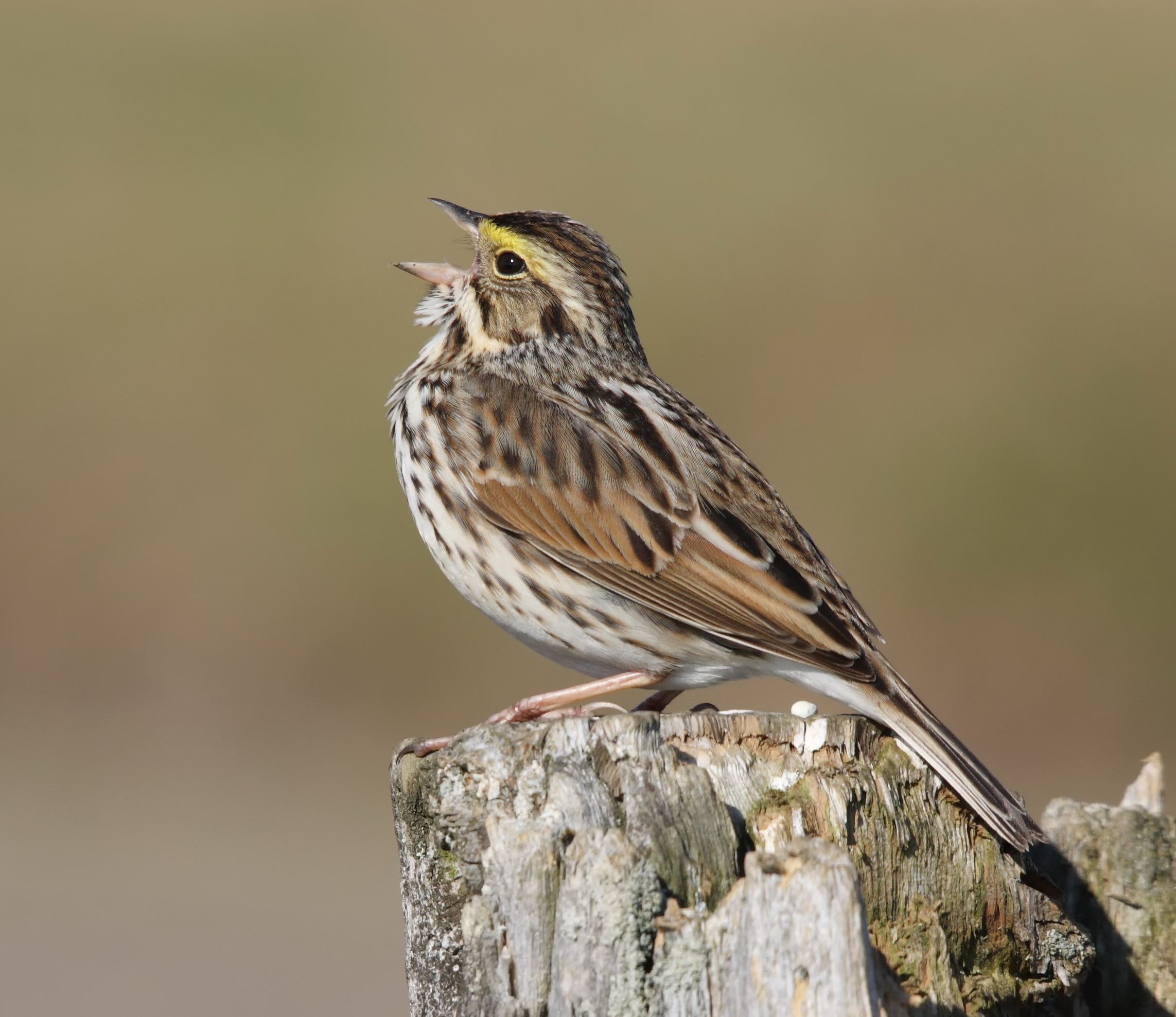
- Singing male, probably P. s. labradorius Cap Tourmente National Wildlife Area, Quebec (Canada)

Conservation status
- Least Concern (IUCN 3.1)

Scientific classification
- Kingdom: Animalia
- Phylum: Chordata
- Class: Aves
- Order: Passeriformes
- Family: Passerellidae
- Genus: Passerculus
- Species: P. sandwichensis

Binomial name
- Passerculus sandwichensis (Gmelin, JF, 1789)

Subspecies
- Some 10–20, see article text
- Breeding Migration Nonbreeding Year-round

Synonyms
- Ammodramus beldingi

= Savannah sparrow =

Species of bird

The Savannah sparrow (Passerculus sandwichensis) is a small New World sparrow that is the only member of the genus Passerculus. It is a widespread and abundant species that occupies open grassland habitats in North America.

Over most of its range it is migratory, breeding in Canada and the northern United States while wintering in Mexico and the southern United States. It is a sexually monomorphic species that is quite variable in appearance. Around 17 subspecies are currently recognised. These are divided into several groups, some of which have sometimes been considered as separate species.

The species name sandwichensis is Latin from Sandwich Sound (now Prince William Sound) in southern Alaska from where the first specimen was collected. The common name refers to Savannah, Georgia, where Alexander Wilson observed the species in 1811.

== Taxonomy ==
The Savannah sparrow was formally described in 1789 by the German naturalist Johann Friedrich Gmelin in his revised and expanded edition of Carl Linnaeus's Systema Naturae. He placed it with the buntings in the genus Emberiza and coined the binomial name Emberiza sandwichensis. Gmelin based his text on the Sandwich bunting that had been described by John Latham in 1783 and the "Unalasha bunting" that had been described by Thomas Pennant in 1785. Latham and Pennant had access to a specimen owned by the naturalist Joseph Banks that had been collected in May 1778 from Sandwich Sound (now Prince William Sound) in southern Alaska during James Cook's third voyage to the Pacific Ocean. The specimen has not survived, but a coloured drawing of the bird made during the voyage by the artist and naturalist William Ellis is now held by the Natural History Museum in London.

The Savannah sparrow is now the only species placed in the genus Passerculus that was introduced in 1838 by the French naturalist Charles Bonaparte. The English name "Savannah sparrow" was introduced in 1811 by the Scottish-American ornithologist Alexander Wilson in the third volume of his American Ornithology; or, the Natural History of the Birds of the United States. Wilson had first seen the species on the coast near Savannah, Georgia.

A 2005 study that compared mitochondrial DNA sequence found that the Ipswich sparrow, formerly usually considered a valid species (as Passerculus princeps), was a well-marked subspecies, whereas the southwestern large-billed sparrow was more distinct (Passerculus rostratus).

Seventeen subspecies (including the large-billed sparrows) are currently recognized, though many are only described from wintering birds and much of the variation seems to be clinal. Four additional subspecies are no longer generally accepted. The complex is usually divided into several groups:

=== Savannah sparrows proper ===
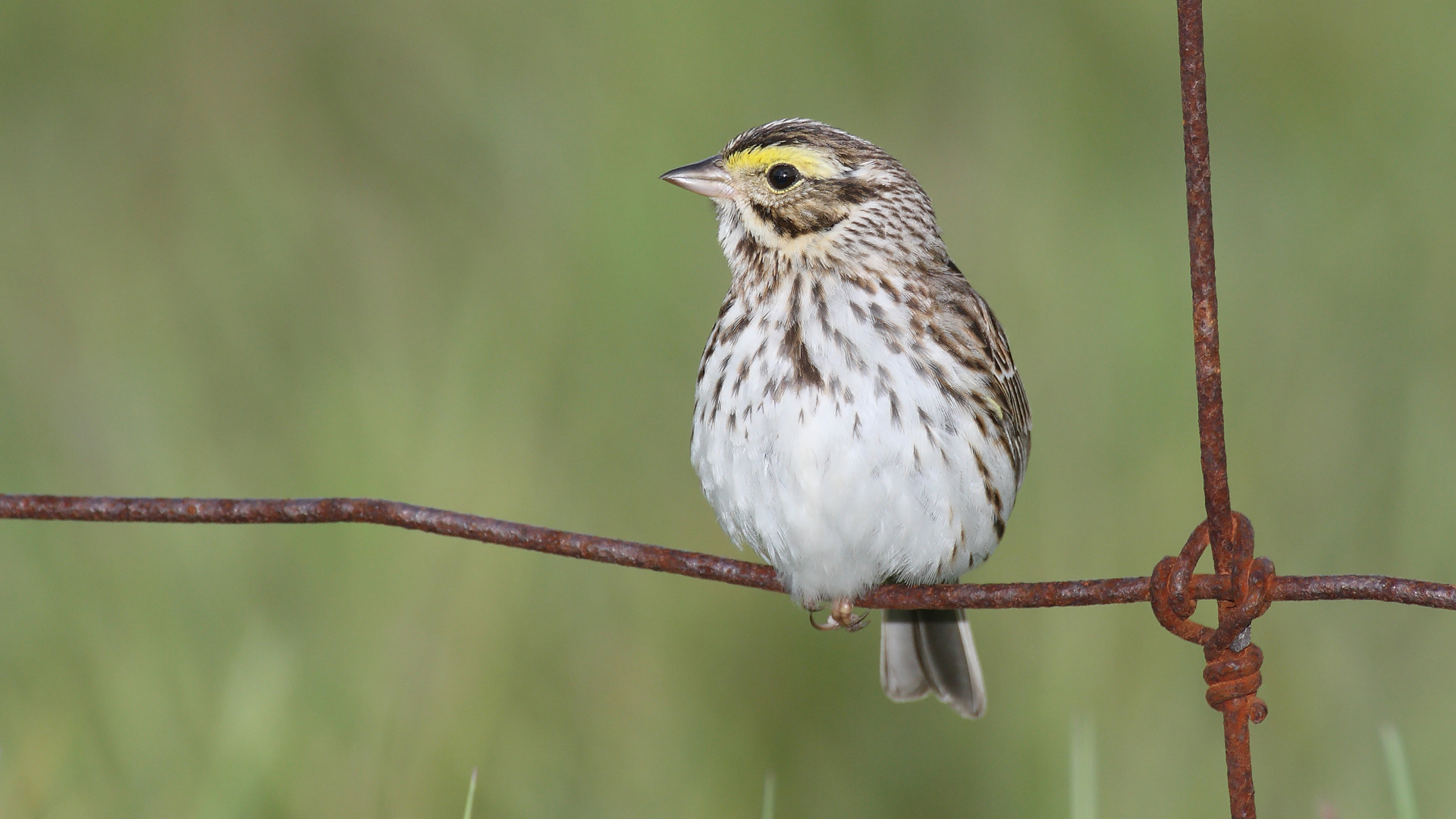
Probably P. s. oblitus, Kirkfield, Ontario, Canada

All are migratory; wintering ranges overlap widely.

- P. s. labradorius Howe, 1901 – breeds in Newfoundland, Labrador, and N Quebec. Includes P. s. oblitus.
- P. s. savanna (Wilson, A, 1811) – (eastern Savannah sparrow), breeds in the northeast US and adjacent Canada (includes P. s. mediogriseus)
- P. s. sandwichensis (Gmelin, JF, 1789) – (Aleutian Savannah sparrow), breeds on the Aleutian Islands and west Alaskan Peninsula
- P. s. anthinus Bonaparte, 1853 – breeds in the remainder of Alaska, south and east to central British Columbia and north of the Great Plains to Manitoba. Includes P. s. crassus.
- P. s. brooksi Bishop, 1915 – (dwarf Savannah sparrow), breeds in southernmost British Columbia to northernmost California
- P. s. alaudinus Bonaparte, 1853 – breeds in coastal northern and central California
- P. s. nevadensis Grinnell, 1910 – breeds in the northern Great Plains and the Great Basin
- P. s. brunnescens (Butler, AW, 1888) – breeds from central Mexico south to Guatemala (includes P. s. rufofuscus)
- P. s. wetmorei Van Rossem, 1938 – a doubtful subspecies that may breed in the mountains of Guatemala. It is known from only five specimens, collected June 11–17, 1897, in Huehuetenango Department.

=== Ipswich sparrow ===
Some post-breeding dispersal. Formerly considered as a distinct species.

- P. s. princeps Maynard, 1872 – breeds almost exclusively on Sable Island which lies southeast of Nova Scotia in the North Atlantic Ocean.

The Ipswich sparrow is somewhat larger and paler in color than other eastern Savannah sparrows. The breast streaks are narrower and pale brown. Some birds overwinter on the island; others migrate south along the Atlantic coast, usually departing later and returning sooner than mainland birds. Some birds interbreed with P. s. savanna in Nova Scotia. These birds frequently raise three broods in a year. This bird was first observed in winter on the dunes near the town of Ipswich, Massachusetts.

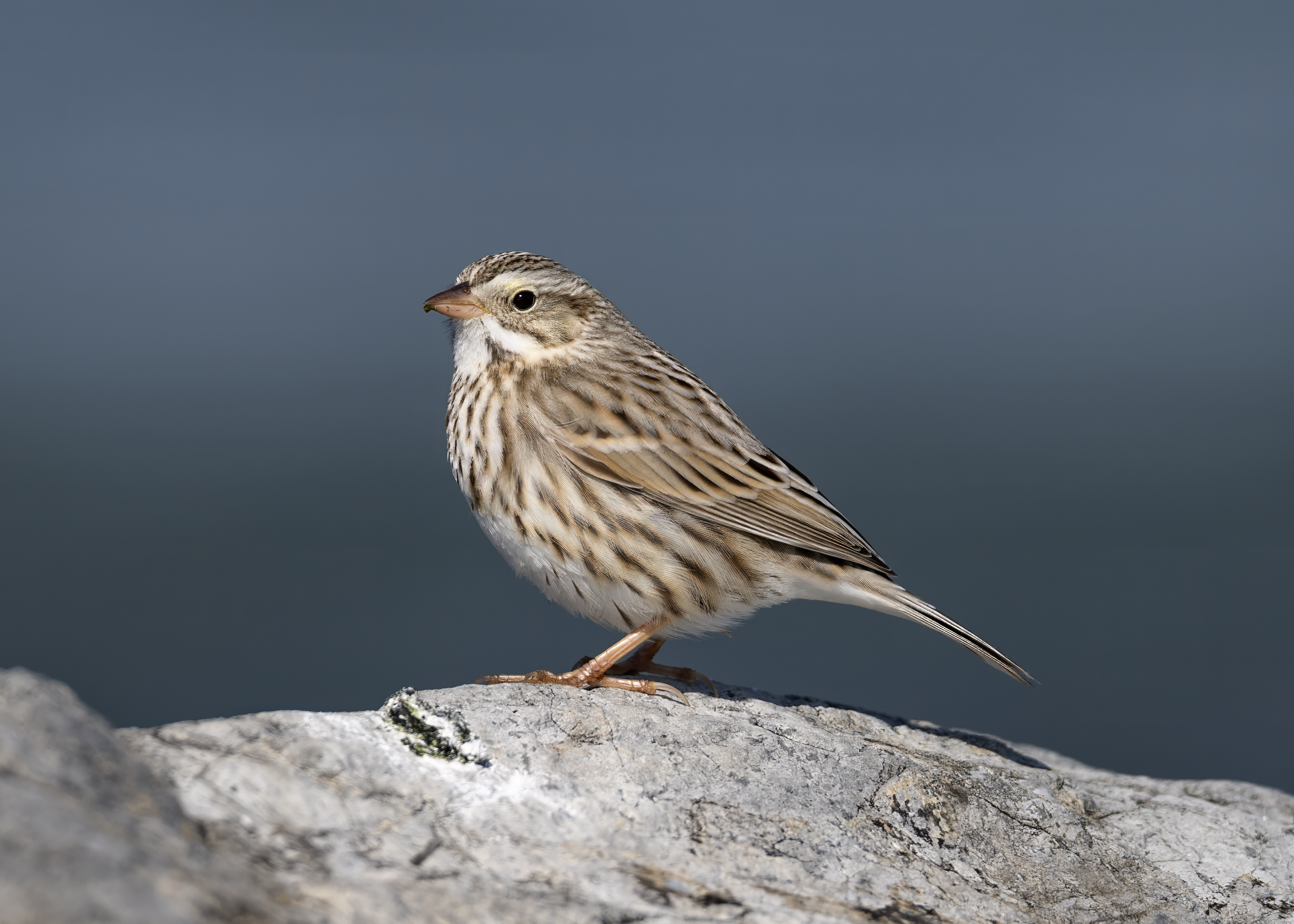
A Savannah sparrow (Ipswich)on the jetty at Barnegat Inlet, NJ.

=== Large-billed sparrows ===
The large-billed sparrows proper is sometimes treated as a separate species. There are two dark, large and strong-billed subspecies:

- P. s. rostratus (Cassin, 1852) – breeds on the Gulf Coast of northeast Baja California and northwest Sonora (some post-breeding dispersal).
- P. s. atratus Van Rossem, 1930 – resident on the coast of central Sonora to central Sinaloa (resident)

Belding's (Savannah/large-billed) sparrows are all-year residents of salt marshes of the Californian Pacific coast. They are dark, rufous, and have rather long but not very hefty bills. This group has been considered as a separate species.

- P. s. beldingi Ridgway, 1885 – resident on the Pacific coast from Morro Bay, California, to El Rosario, Baja California (includes P. r./s. bryanti)
- P. s. anulus Huey, 1930 – resident around Sebastián Vizcaíno Bay, Baja California
- P. s. guttatus Lawrence, 1867 – resident around San Ignacio Lagoon
- P. s. magdalenae Van Rossem, 1947 – resident around Magdalena Bay

San Benito (Savannah/large-billed) sparrow is a resident bird of the Islas San Benito off Baja California; a stray bird was observed on Cedros Island on April 21, 1906. It has been considered as a separate species.

- P. s. sanctorum Coues, 1884

This is a large-bodied and large-billed subspecies, similar to rostratus. They utilize different habitat and their breeding season does not seem to coincide (Note: For late April 1906, Thayer & Bangs (1907) report nestlings, young birds molting into adult plumage, but no eggs anymore. Rising in Zink et al. (2005) found no breeding activity in late April 1999. Consequently, breeding seems to take place in the winter months, with the last young fledging in April/May.) with that of Belding's sparrows. However, their bill size is due to convergent evolution and their habitat choice simply to the lack of alternatives on their barren island home; altogether, it appears to be a fairly recent offshoot from the Belding's sparrows group. It appears as distinct evolutionarily from these as does the Ipswich sparrow from the Savannah sparrow proper group, only that there seems to have been more gene flow and/or a larger founder population in the case of the latter.

== Description ==
The Savannah sparrow has a typically sparrow-like dark-streaked brown back, and whitish underparts with brown or blackish breast and flank streaking. It has whitish crown and supercilium stripes, sometimes with some yellow (more often near the beak). The cheeks are brown and the throat white. The flight feathers are blackish-brown with light brown or white border. The eyes are dark. The feet and legs are horn-colored, as is the lower part of the bill, with the upper part being dark grey.

It is a very variable species, with numerous subspecies, several of which have been split as separate species at various times. The different forms vary principally in the darkness of the plumage. The variation generally follows Gloger's rule, with Alaskan and interior races the palest, and southwestern coastal forms the darkest. There are some exceptions, though, most conspicuously in some island populations that presumably were strongly affected by founder effects. The general pattern of variation has a fairly clear divide, southwest of which the birds become notably darker; this agrees quite well with the limit between P. sandwichensis and P. (s.) rostratus. Savannah sparrows show some variation in size across subspecies. The total length can range from 11 to 17 cm (4.3 to 6.7 in), wingspan ranges from 18 to 25 cm (7.1 to 9.8 in) and body mass from 15 to 29 g (0.53 to 1.02 oz). In the nominate subspecies, the body weight averages 20.1 g (0.71 oz).

The Savannah sparrows proper (see below) are very similar, and migrant birds can not usually be related to a breeding population with certainty. The resident or partially migratory subspecies are well distinguishable by size and, particularly between groups, coloration.

== Distribution and habitat ==
This passerine bird breeds in Alaska, Canada, northern, central and Pacific coastal United States, Mexico and Guatemala. The Pacific and Mexican breeders are resident, but other populations are migratory, wintering from the southern United States across Central America and the Caribbean to northern South America. It is a very rare vagrant to western Europe.

== Behavior ==
Savannah sparrow song
A Savannah sparrow singing from the edge of a restored prairie in Iowa

These birds forage on the ground or in low bushes; particularly in winter they are also found in grazed low-growth grassland. They mainly eat seeds, but also eat insects in the breeding season. They are typically encountered as pairs or family groups in the breeding season, and assemble in flocks for the winter migration. The flight call is a thin seep. Sensu lato, the Savannah sparrow is considered a threatened species by the IUCN. The song is mixture of chirps and trills.

== Gallery ==
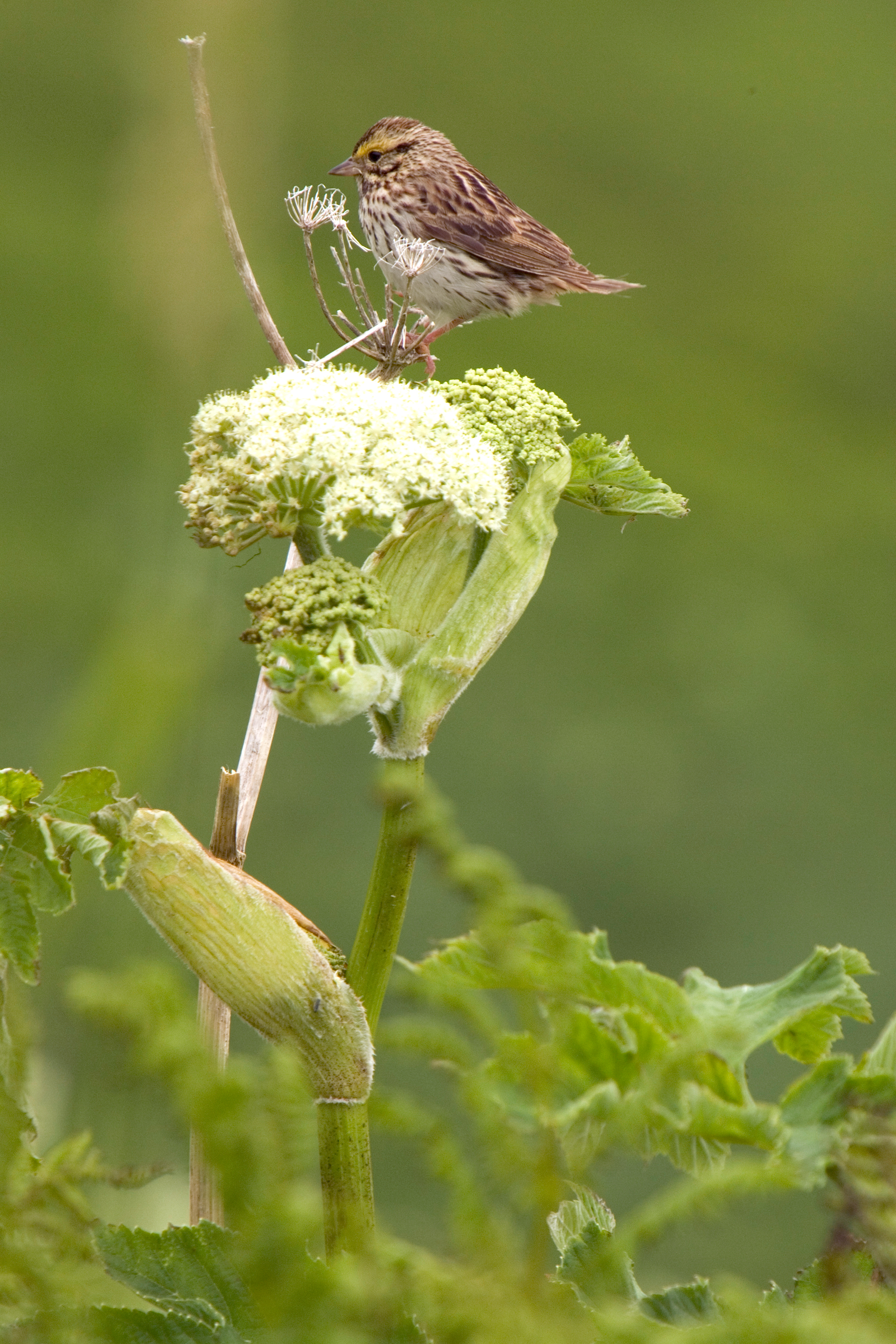
Probably P. s. sandwichensis, Alaska

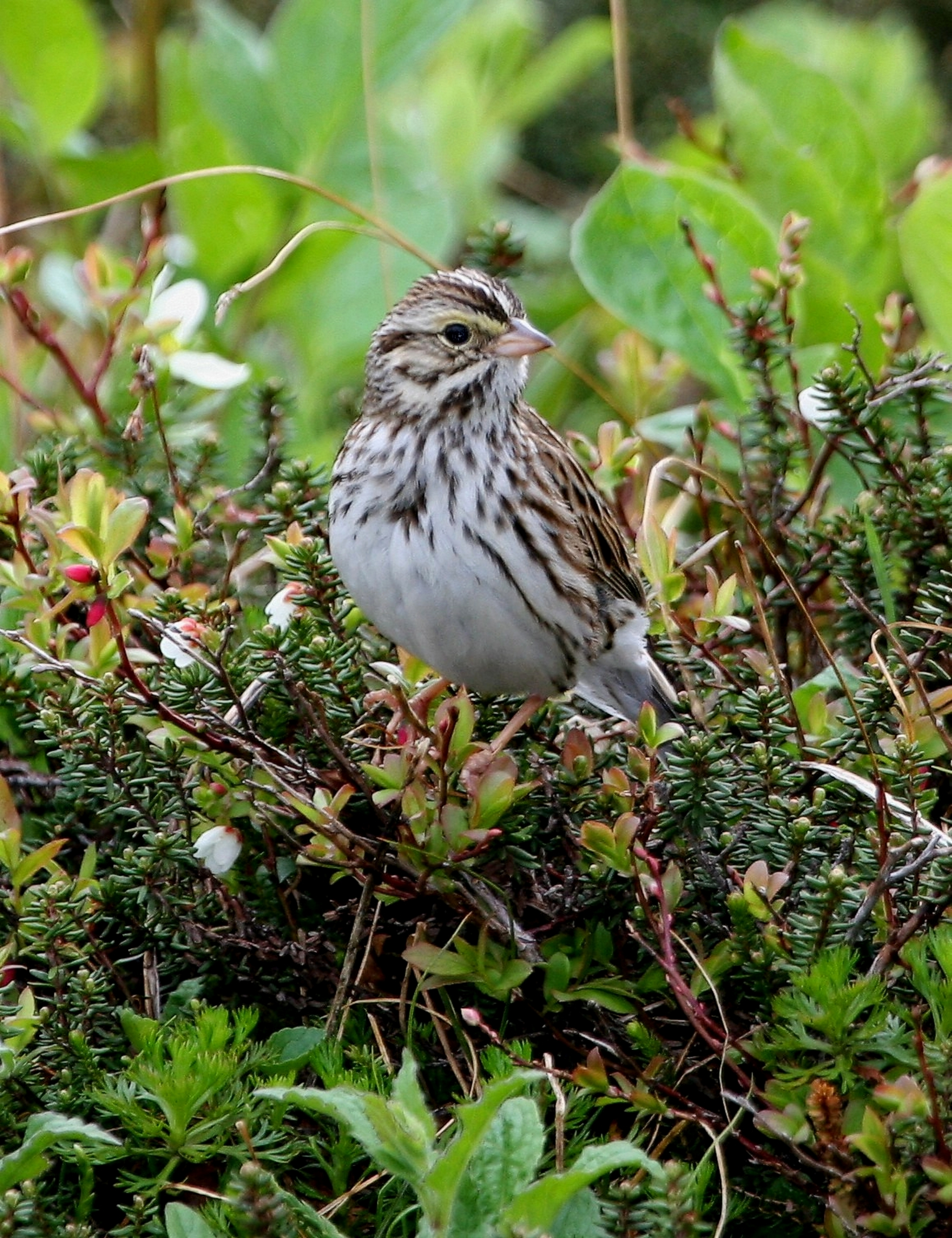
Probably P. s. anthinus, Alaska

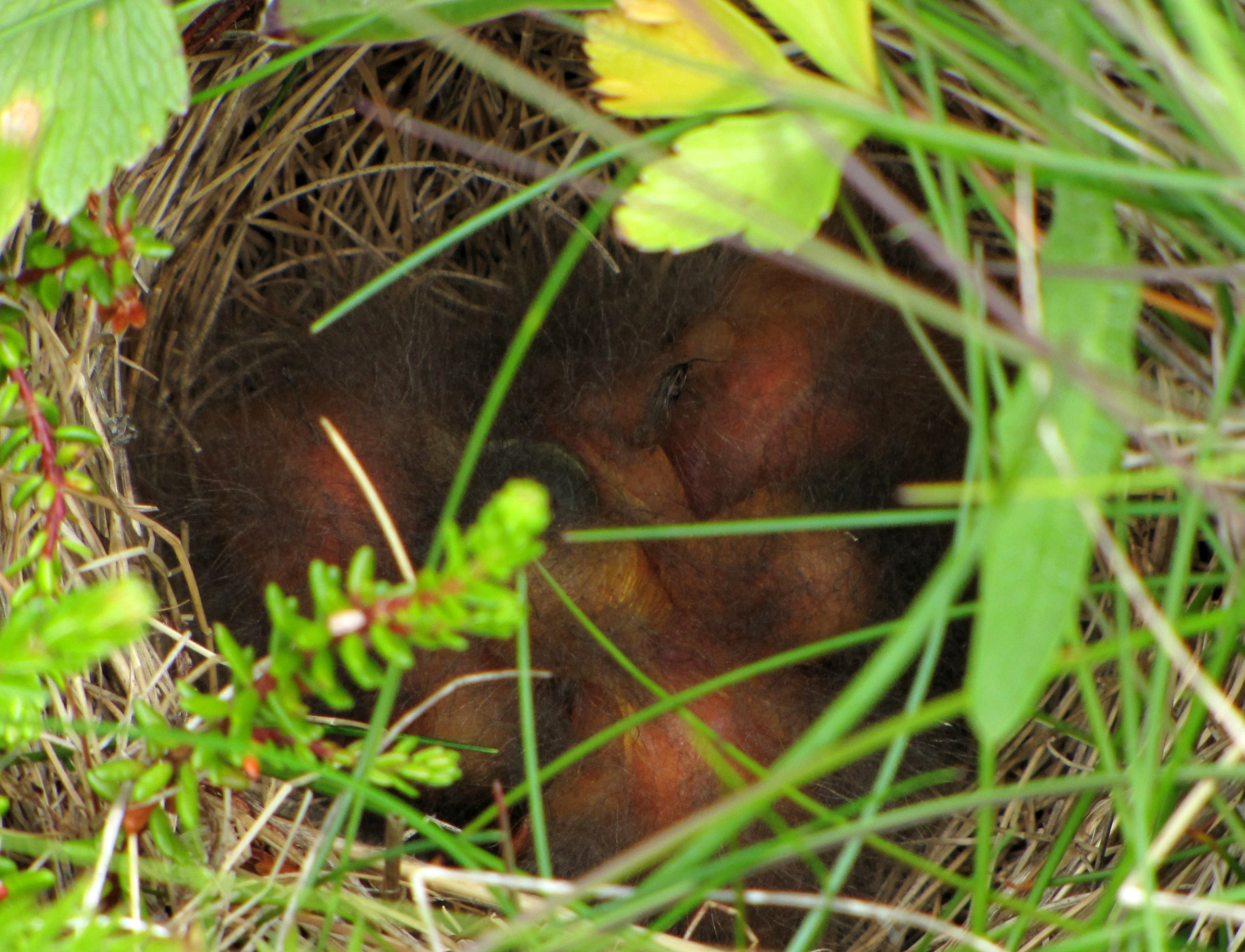
P. s. labradorius nest

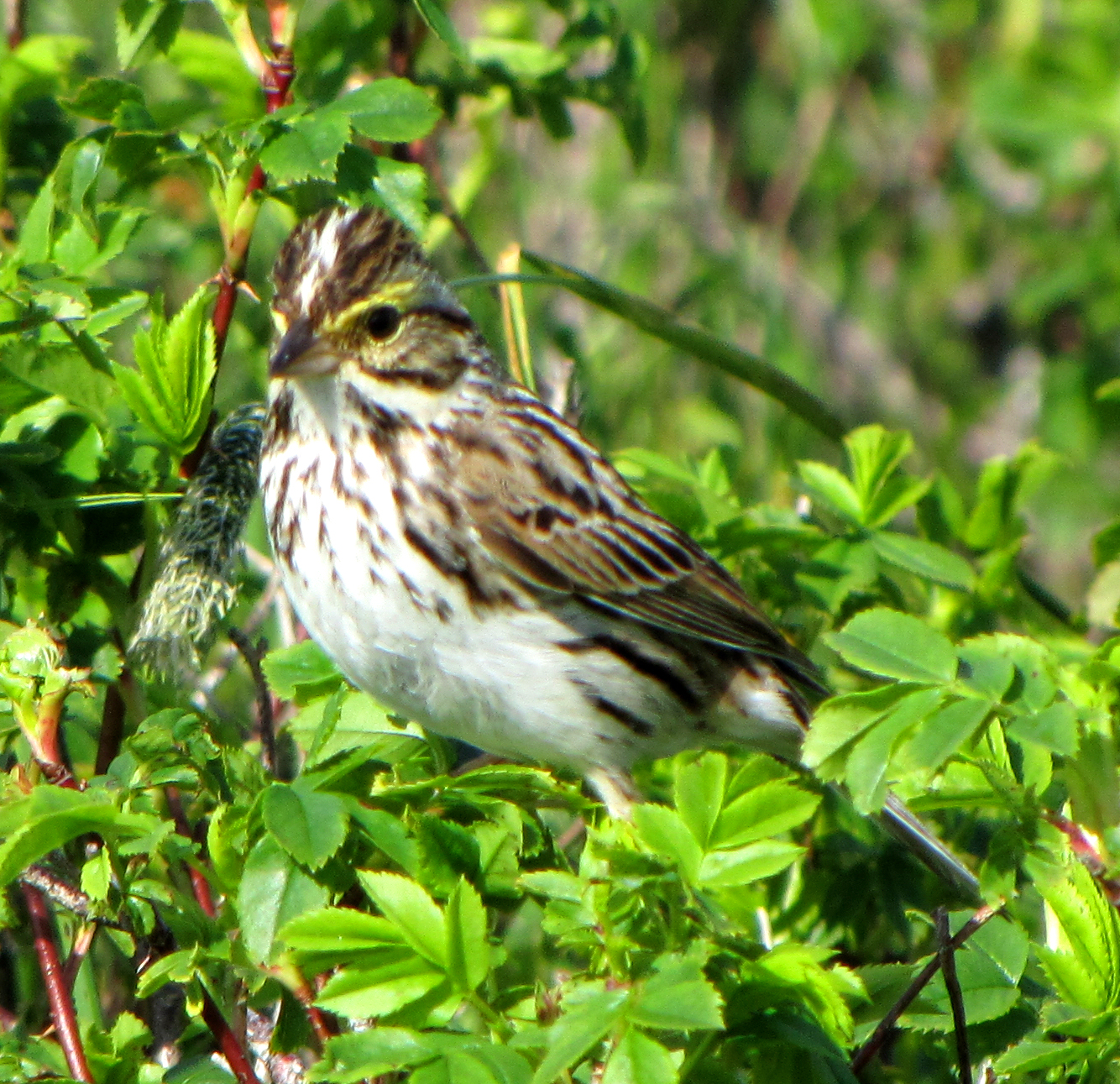
P. s. labradorius, Newfoundland

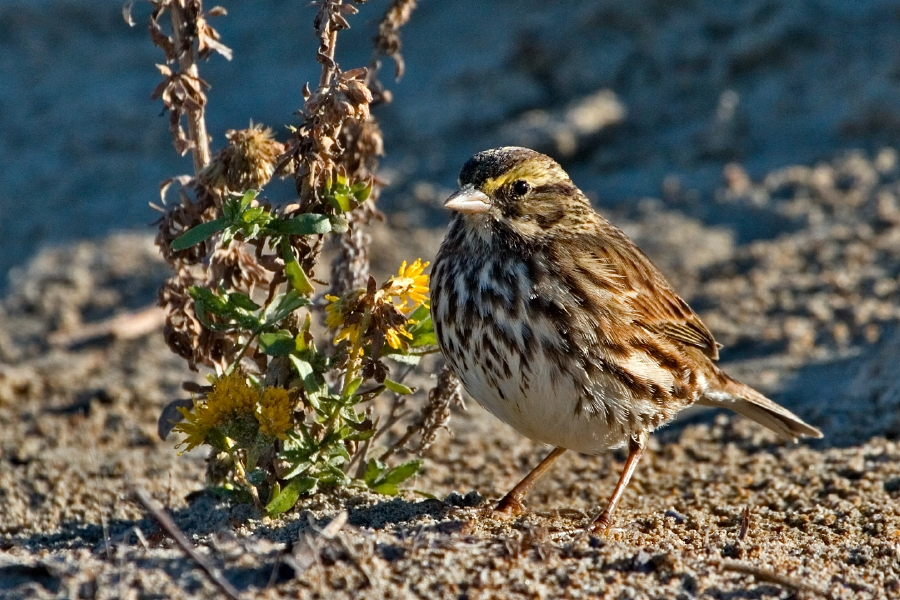
Probably a Belding's sparrow, wintering in California
