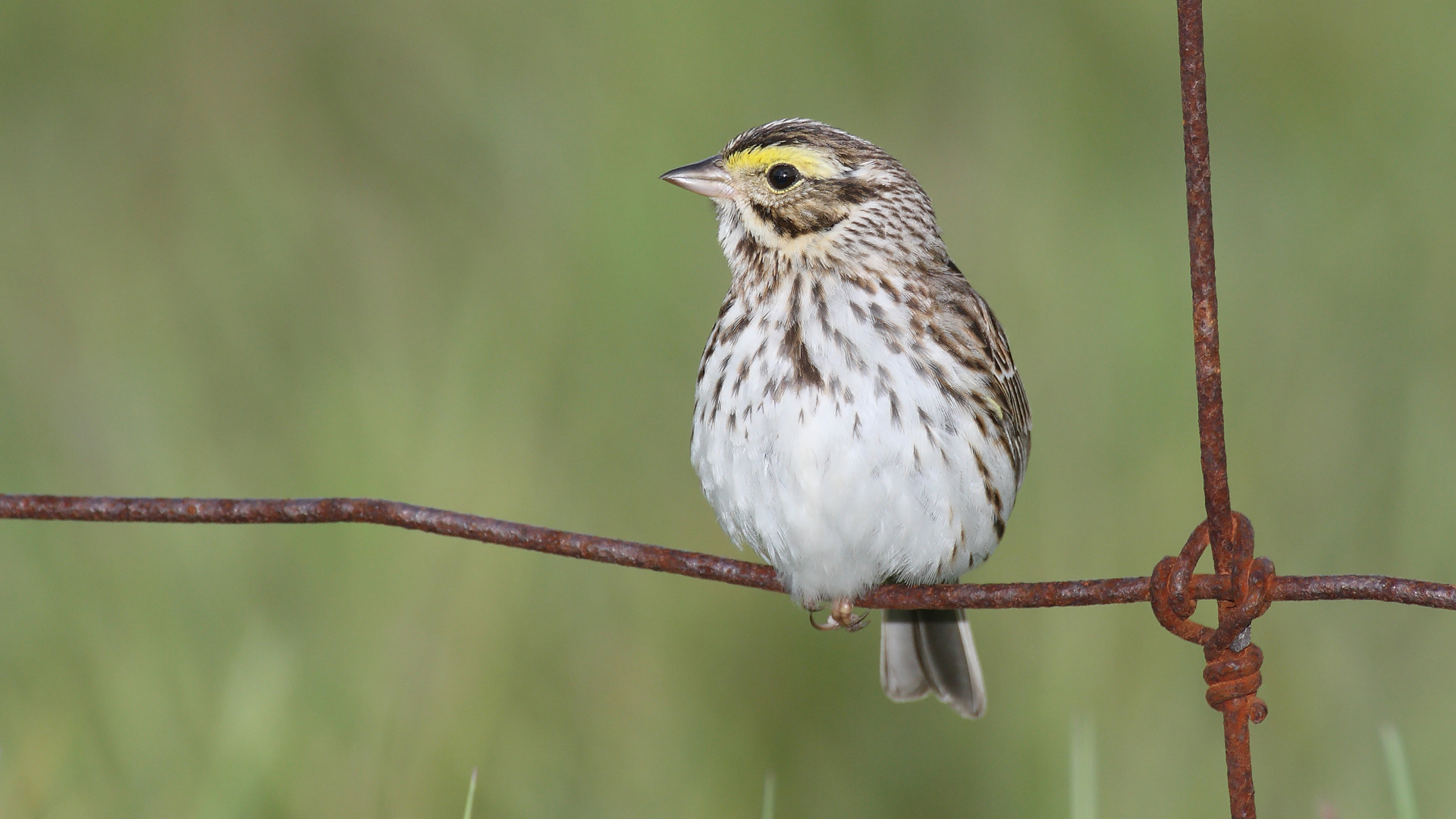
- Savannah sparrow (P. sandwichensis)

Scientific classification
- Kingdom: Animalia
- Phylum: Chordata
- Class: Aves
- Order: Passeriformes
- Family: Passerellidae
- Genus: Passerculus; Bonaparte, 1838

Type species
- Fringilla savanna A. Wilson, 1811

Species
- See text

= Passerculus =

Genus of birds

Passerculus is a genus of birds that belongs to the New World sparrow family Passerellidae. Currently it is considered to include just the Savannah sparrow (P. sandwichensis).
