= Alexander Lawson =

- Born: c.1773 Renfrewshire, Scotland
- Died: August 22, 1846 (aged 72); Philadelphia, Pennsylvania, United States
- Known for: Ornithological engraving
- Scientific career
- Fields: naturalist

Alexander Lawson (c.1773 – August 23, 1846) was a Scottish-American intaglio artist and engraver based in Philadelphia, Pennsylvania, who earned renown as the primary engraver of American Ornithology 9 vols. (1808–1814), authored by Alexander Wilson (1766–1813). Lawson engraved fifty copper plates (60% of the total) for that work, and also contributed to the extended editions authored or edited by George Ord (1781–1866) and Charles Lucien Bonaparte (1803–1857). Lawson also engraved for several magazines in Philadelphia, including the Port Folio and Philadelphia Medical Museum.

== Biography ==
=== Early life in Scotland and England ===
Lawson's date and location of birth are contested because of unresolved discrepancies among primary sources. William Dunlap (1766 1839) published a transcript of a letter (now unlocated) in which Lawson reportedly wrote to an unnamed friend: "I was born near Lanark in Scotland, in the year 1773". However, a posthumous biography written by Malvina Lawson (c.1806–1884), his eldest daughter, which she deposited at the Academy of Natural Sciences of Philadelphia, stated that Lawson was born on 19 December 1772, "at Ravenstruther, a village in Lanarkshire, Scotland". Furthermore, an epitaph carved into a granite obelisk that marks Lawson's grave at Laurel Hill Cemetery (Section R, Lot 134) states that he was "born in Ravenshire, Scotland / Dec. 22 1779".

In the Dunlap (1834) transcript, Lawson stated that he "went to Manchester, in England, when sixteen," where he studied printmaking with a bookseller. Malvina's biography states that this happened in Liverpool.

=== Emigration and entry in Philadelphia printing scene ===
According to Dunlap's (1834) transcript, Lawson stated: "I gave up my share in the [Manchester] business, and in my twentieth year, embarked from Liverpool for Baltimore, where I arrived on the 14th of July, 1794. I staid in that city one week, and the came to Philadelphia, where I have remained ever since. Lawson worked for James Thackara and John Vallance for two years.

=== American Ornithology (1808–14) ===
Lawson met Alexander Wilson in 1798, according to Malvina, but they had limited contact until March 1804, when their friendship reignited and Wilson moved in with Lawson at the "Jones House" on Spruce St., near Pennsylvania Hospital, in Philadelphia.

=== Death ===
Lawson died on August 22, 1846, and was buried at Laurel Hill Cemetery.
