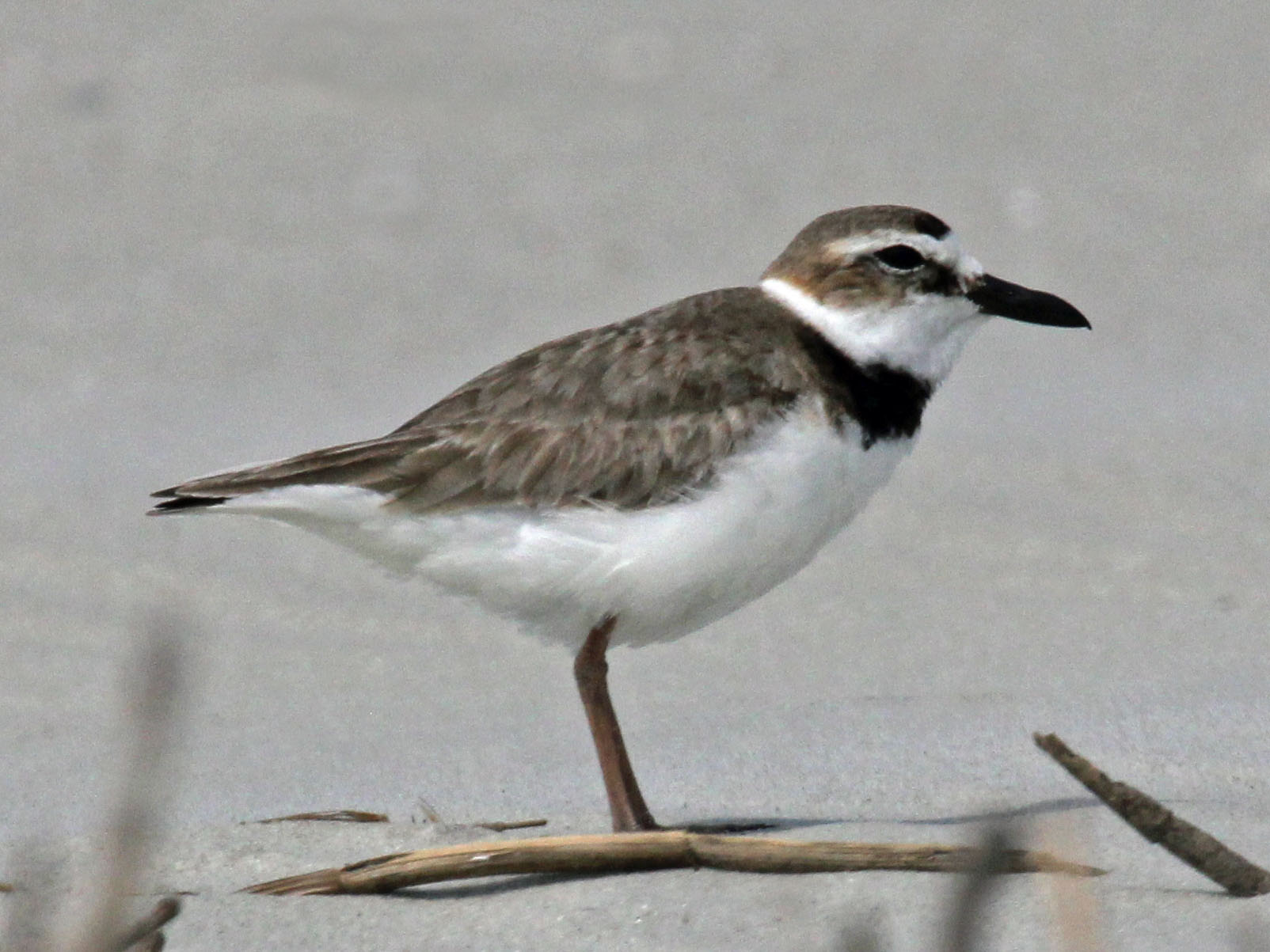
- Breeding male (pair of below)
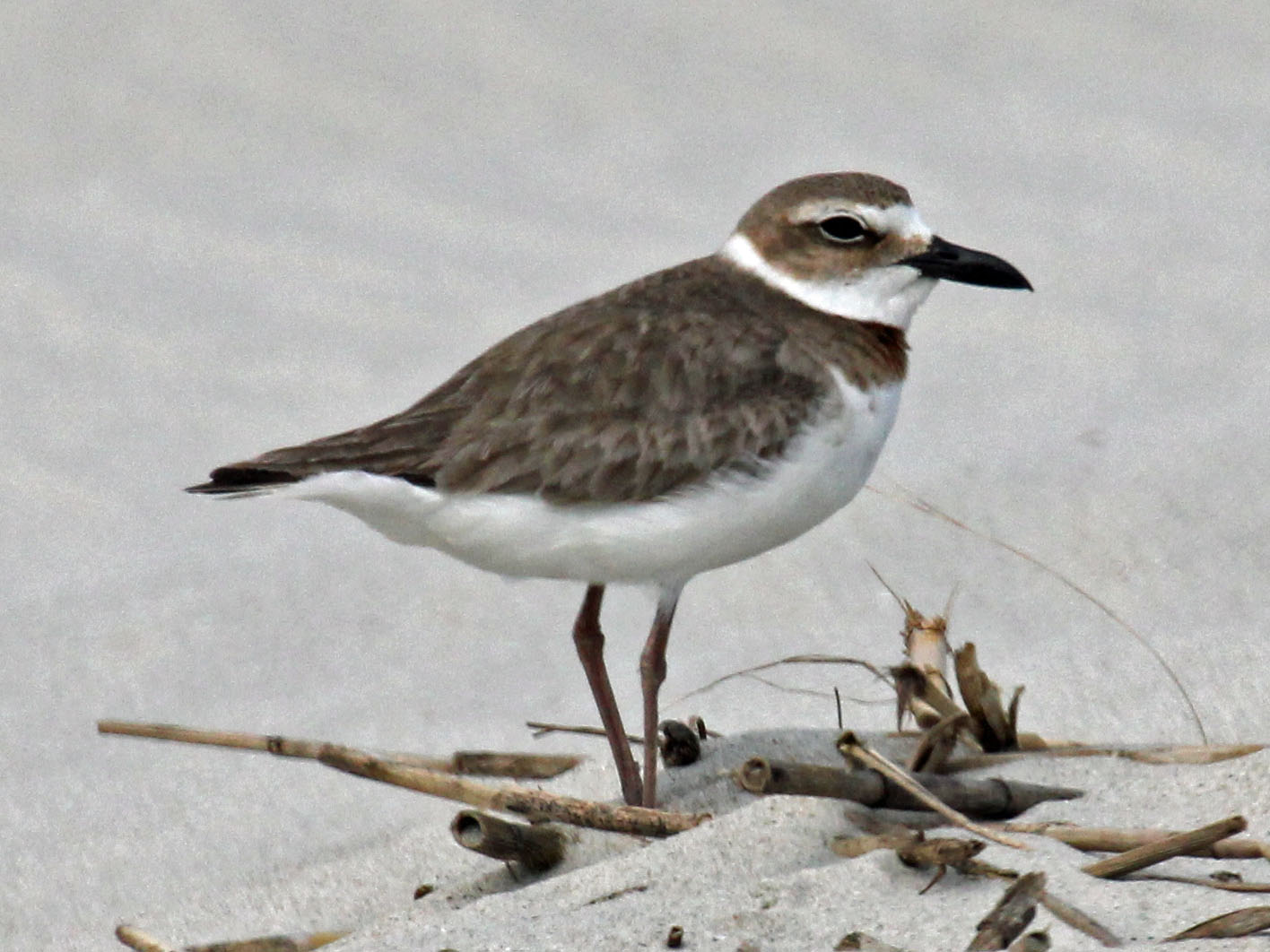
- Breeding female (pair of above)

Conservation status
- Least Concern (IUCN 3.1)

Scientific classification
- Kingdom: Animalia
- Phylum: Chordata
- Class: Aves
- Order: Charadriiformes
- Family: Charadriidae
- Genus: Anarhynchus
- Species: A. wilsonia

Binomial name
- Anarhynchus wilsonia (Ord, 1814)
- Range Year-round Breeding

Synonyms
- Charadrius wilsonia (protonym)

= Wilson's plover =

Species of bird

Wilson's plover (Anarhynchus wilsonia) is a small bird of the family Charadriidae.

It was named after the Scottish-American ornithologist Alexander Wilson by his friend George Ord in 1814.

Wilson's plover is a coastal wader which breeds on both coasts of the Americas from the equator northwards. Its range extends north to include much of the U.S. eastern seaboard, and the Pacific coast of Mexico on the west.

== Range and habitat ==
It is a partial migrant. Birds leave the United States, except Florida, to winter south in Brazil. Some Mexican birds leave in winter for Peru. Furthermore, a small resident population is known from Brazil, it being named as a new subspecies, brasiliensis, in 2008. In 2012 it was established that this is a junior synonym, and the correct name for the subspecies is crassirostris. This also means that one of the subspecies of the greater sand plover had to be renamed.

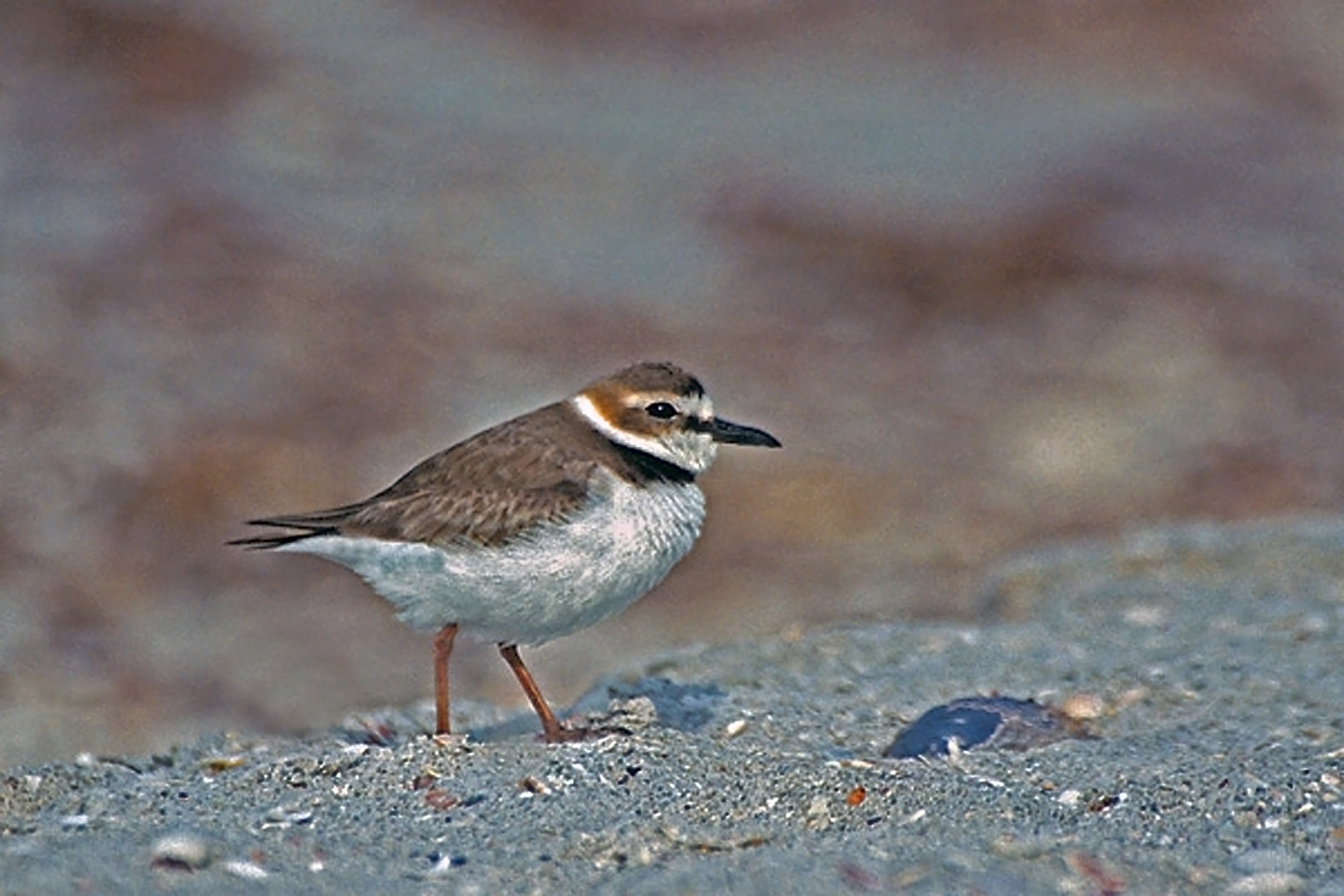
A plover on Sanibel Island, Florida.

This strictly coastal plover nests on a bare scrape on sandy beaches or sandbars.

== Description ==
The breeding male has a black breast band, lores and forecrown, and a rufous mask. Females and non-breeding males have a similar plumage, but the black of the breeding male is replaced by brown or rufous. Non-breeders have a greyer tint to the head and breast band. Immature birds are similar to the female, but the breast band is often incomplete. The adult's upper parts are mainly dark grey, with a short white wing bar and white tail sides. The underparts are white except for a breast band, and the legs are pink, brighter when breeding. The dark bill is large and heavy for a plover of this size. The call is a high weak whistle.

Measurements:

- Length: 6.3-7.9 in (16-20 cm)
- Weight: 1.9-2.5 oz (55-70 g)
- Wingspan: 19 in (48.2 cm)

== Diet ==
Wilson's plovers forage for food on beaches, usually by sight, moving slowly across the beach. They have a liking for crabs, but will also eat insects and marine worms.
