= Estevia =

Estevia Temporal range: Early Eocene Fushun amber

Scientific classification
- Kingdom: Animalia
- Phylum: Arthropoda
- Class: Insecta
- Order: Hymenoptera
- Family: Formicidae
- Clade: Doryloformicia
- Subfamily: Formicinae
- Tribe: incertae sedis
- Genus: †Estevia; Fisher, 2025

Type species
- Wilsonia megagastrosa (Hong, 2002)

Diversity
- 2 species

Genus of ants

Estevia is a genus of fossil formicine ants containg two species known from Fushun amber. It was originally described in 2002 by Chinese paleoentomologist Youchong Hong (zh:洪友崇) as Wilsonia, an honorific of biologist E. O. Wilson, however entomologist Brian Fisher found that the name was a junior secondary homonym of the bird genus Wilsonia described in 1838 and designated Estevia as a replacement name in 2026 in honor of Brazilian myrmecologist Flávia Esteves.

== Species ==
As of 2026, the genus includes one species officially designated within the genus and one implied.

- Estevia liaoningensis (Hong, 2002)
- Estevia megagastrosa (Hong, 2002)
