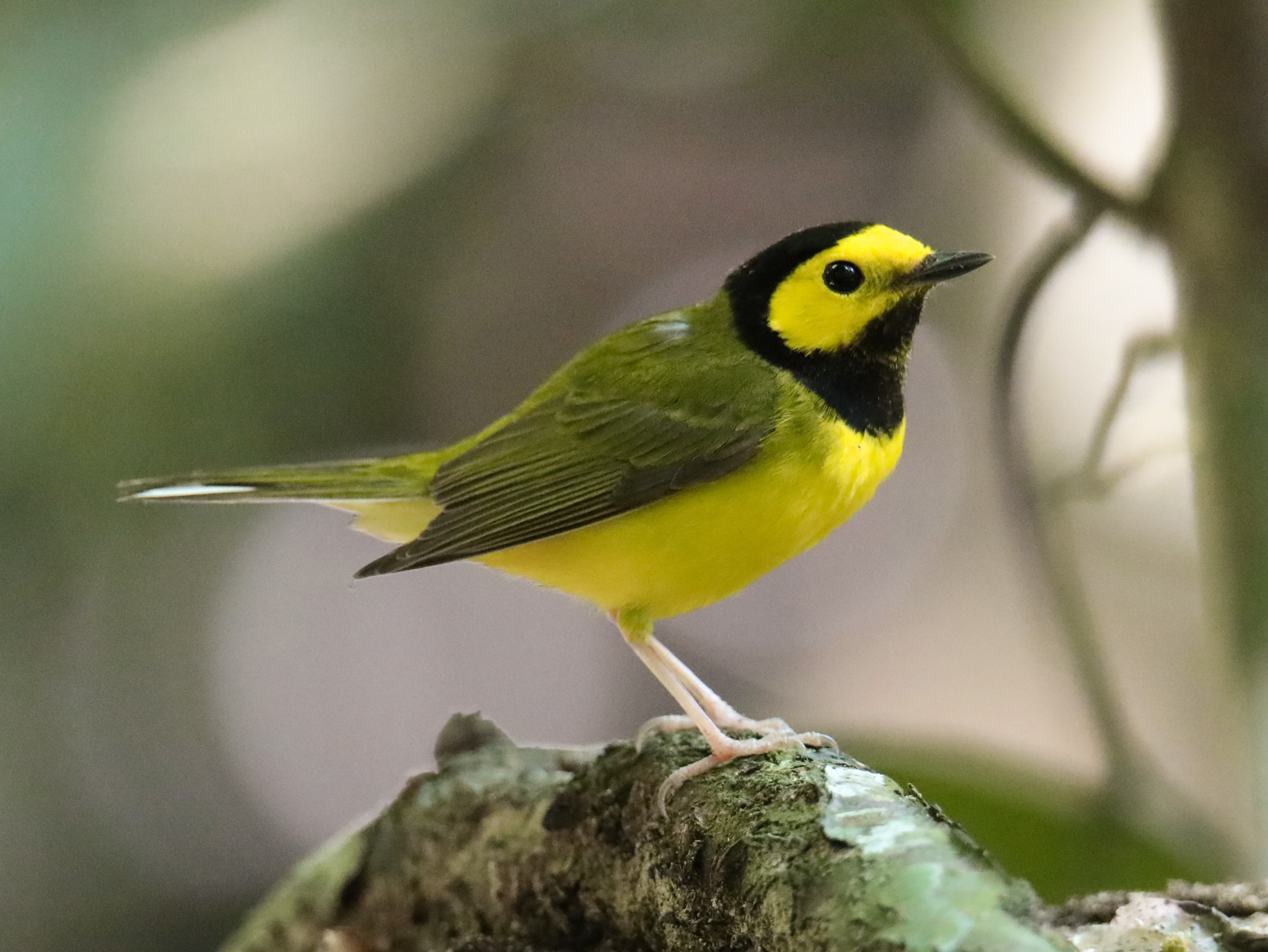
- Adult male

Conservation status
- Least Concern (IUCN 3.1)

Scientific classification
- Kingdom: Animalia
- Phylum: Chordata
- Class: Aves
- Order: Passeriformes
- Family: Parulidae
- Genus: Setophaga
- Species: S. citrina

Binomial name
- Setophaga citrina (Boddaert, 1783)
- Range of S. citrina (note: missing distribution on Hispaniola) Breeding range Wintering range

Synonyms
- Wilsonia citrina Dendroica citrina

= Hooded warbler =

Species of bird

The hooded warbler (Setophaga citrina) is a New World warbler. It breeds in eastern North America across the eastern United States and into southernmost Canada (Ontario). It is migratory, wintering in Central America and the West Indies. Hooded warblers are very rare vagrants to western Europe.

Recent genetic research has suggested that the type species of Wilsonia (hooded warbler W. citrina) and of Setophaga (American redstart S. ruticilla) are closely related and should be merged into the same genus. As the name Setophaga (published in 1827) takes priority over Wilsonia (published in 1838), hooded warbler would then be transferred as Setophaga citrina. This change has been accepted by the North American Classification Committee of the American Ornithologists' Union, and the IOC World Bird List. The South American Classification Committee continues to list the bird in the genus Wilsonia.

== Taxonomy ==
The French polymath Georges-Louis Leclerc, Comte de Buffon described the hooded warbler in 1779 in his Histoire Naturelle des Oiseaux from a specimen collected in Louisiana. The bird was also illustrated in a hand-coloured plate engraved by François-Nicolas Martinet in the Planches Enluminées D'Histoire Naturelle which was produced under the supervision of Edme-Louis Daubenton to accompany Buffon's text. Neither the plate caption nor Buffon's description included a scientific name but in 1783 the Dutch naturalist Pieter Boddaert coined the binomial name Muscicapa citrina in his catalogue of the Planches Enluminées.

The hooded warbler was formerly placed in the genus Wilsonia. A molecular phylogenetic study of the family Parulidae published in 2010 found that the hooded warbler was embedded in a clade that contained species then assigned to Dendroica as well as two of four species of Parula and the monotypic genera Catharopeza and Setophaga. To create a monophyletic genus, all members of the clade were placed in the expanded genus Setophaga, which under the rules of the International Code of Zoological Nomenclature, had priority. The genus Setophaga was introduced by the English naturalist William Swainson in 1827. The species is monotypic; no subspecies are recognised. The genus name Setophaga is from Ancient Greek ses, "moth", and phagos, "eating", and the specific citrina is Latin for citrine.

== Description ==
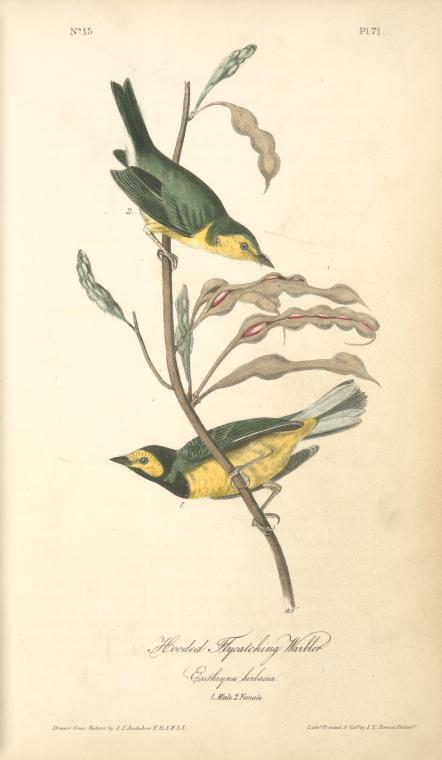
Hooded Warbler in Audubon's Birds of America

The hooded warbler is a small bird and mid-sized warbler, measuring 13 cm (5.1 in) in length and weighing 9–12 g (0.32–0.42 oz). The hooded warbler has a wingspan of 6.9 in (17.5 cm). It has a plain olive/green-brown back and yellow underparts. Their outer rectrices have whitish vanes. Males have distinctive black hoods which surround their yellow faces; the female has an olive-green cap which does not extend to the forehead, ears, and throat. Males attain their hood at about 9–12 months of age; younger birds are essentially identical to (and easily confused with) females. The song is a series of musical notes which sound like: wheeta wheeta whee-tee-oh, for which a common mnemonic is "The red, the red T-shirt" or "Come to the woods or you won't see me". The call of these birds is a loud chip.

== Life history ==
These birds feed on insects, which are often found in low vegetation or caught by flycatching. Hooded warblers' breeding habitats are broadleaved woodlands with dense undergrowth. These birds nest in low areas of a bush, laying three to five eggs in a cup-shaped nest. Hooded warblers are often the victims of brood parasitism by the brown-headed cowbird, especially where the hooded warblers' forest habitats are fragmented. In areas with protected woodlands or recovering wooded habitats, the hooded warbler population is stable and possibly increasing.

== Gallery ==
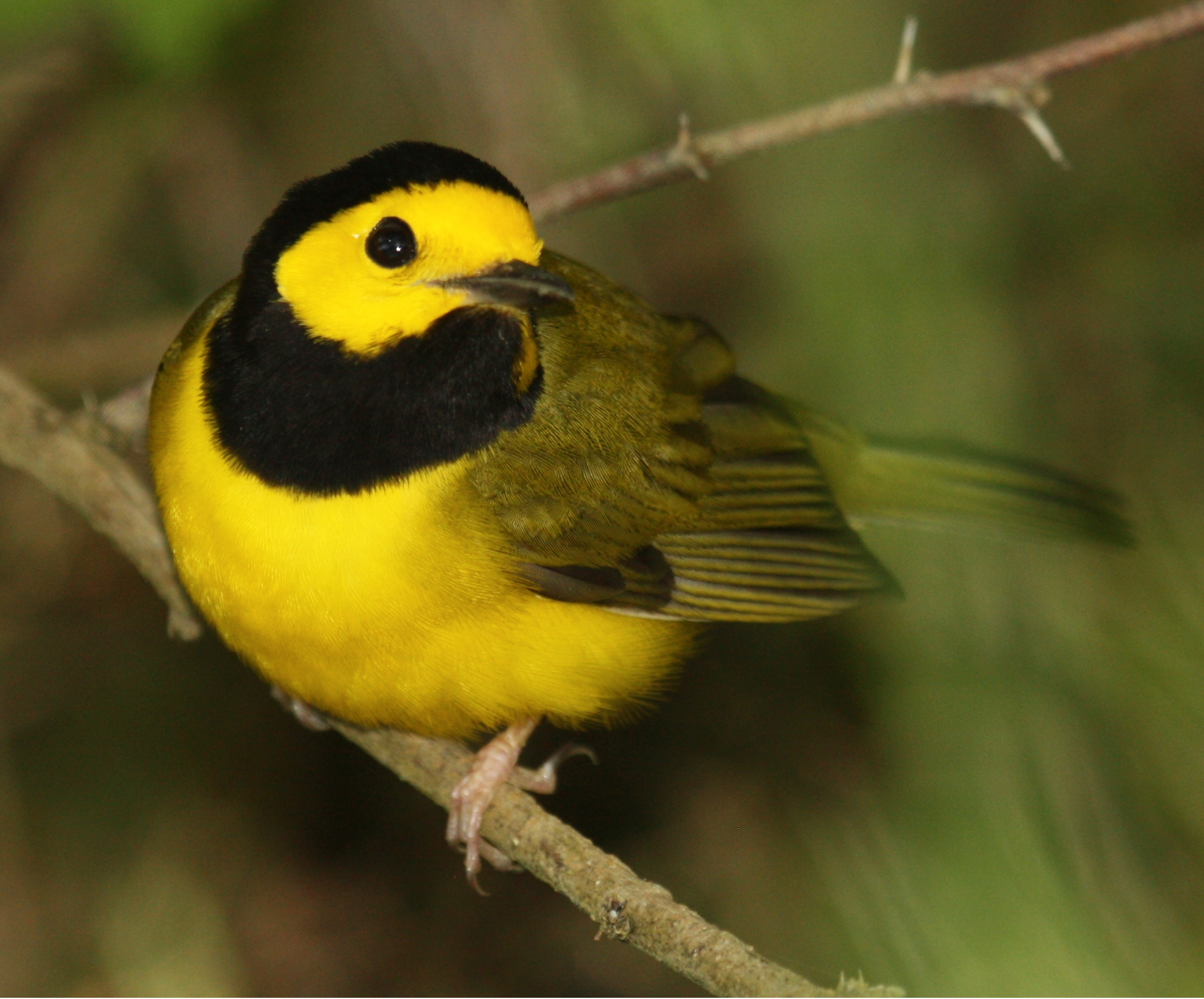
South Padre Island Birding & Nature Center - Texas

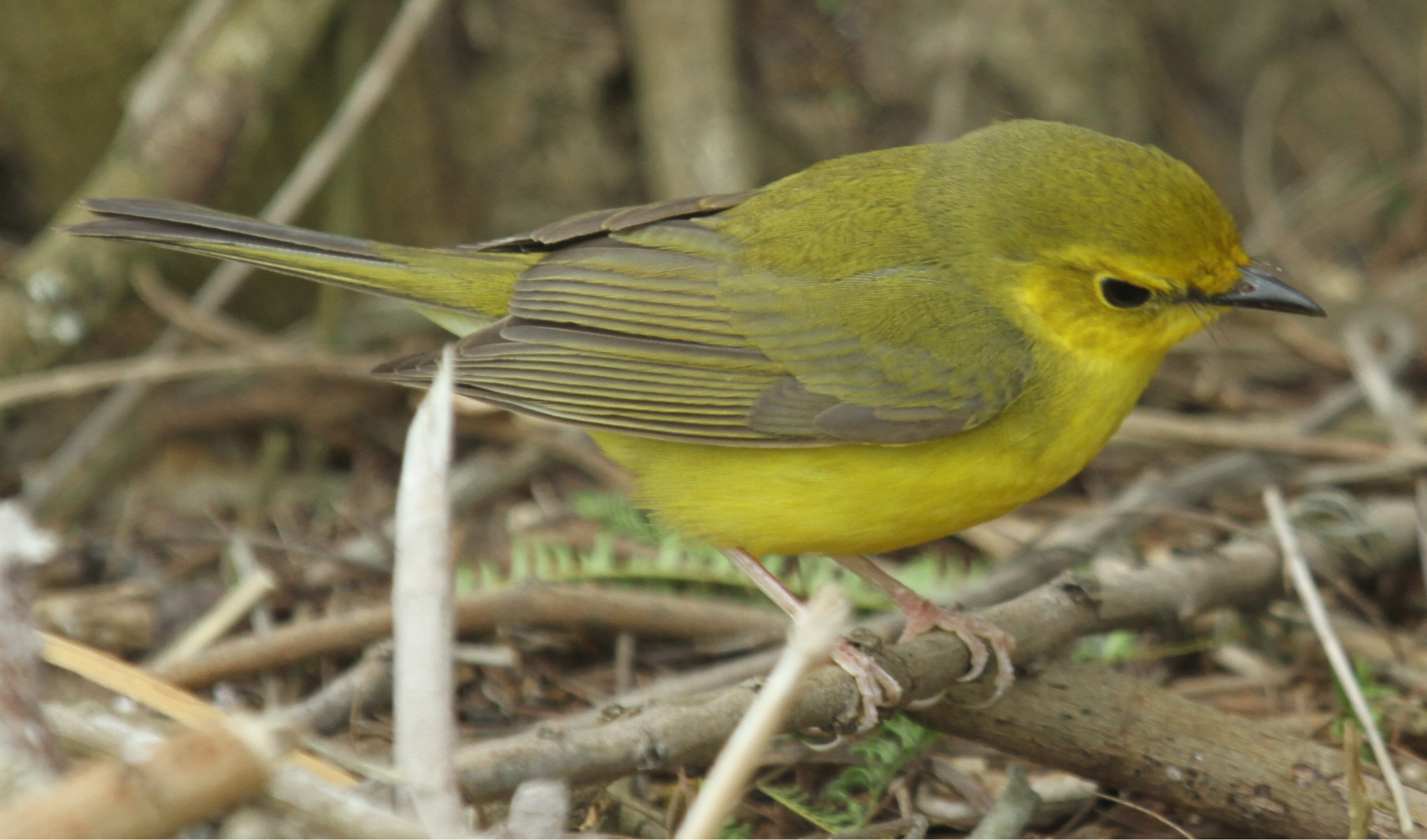
1st yr female - South Padre Island Birding & Nature Center - Texas

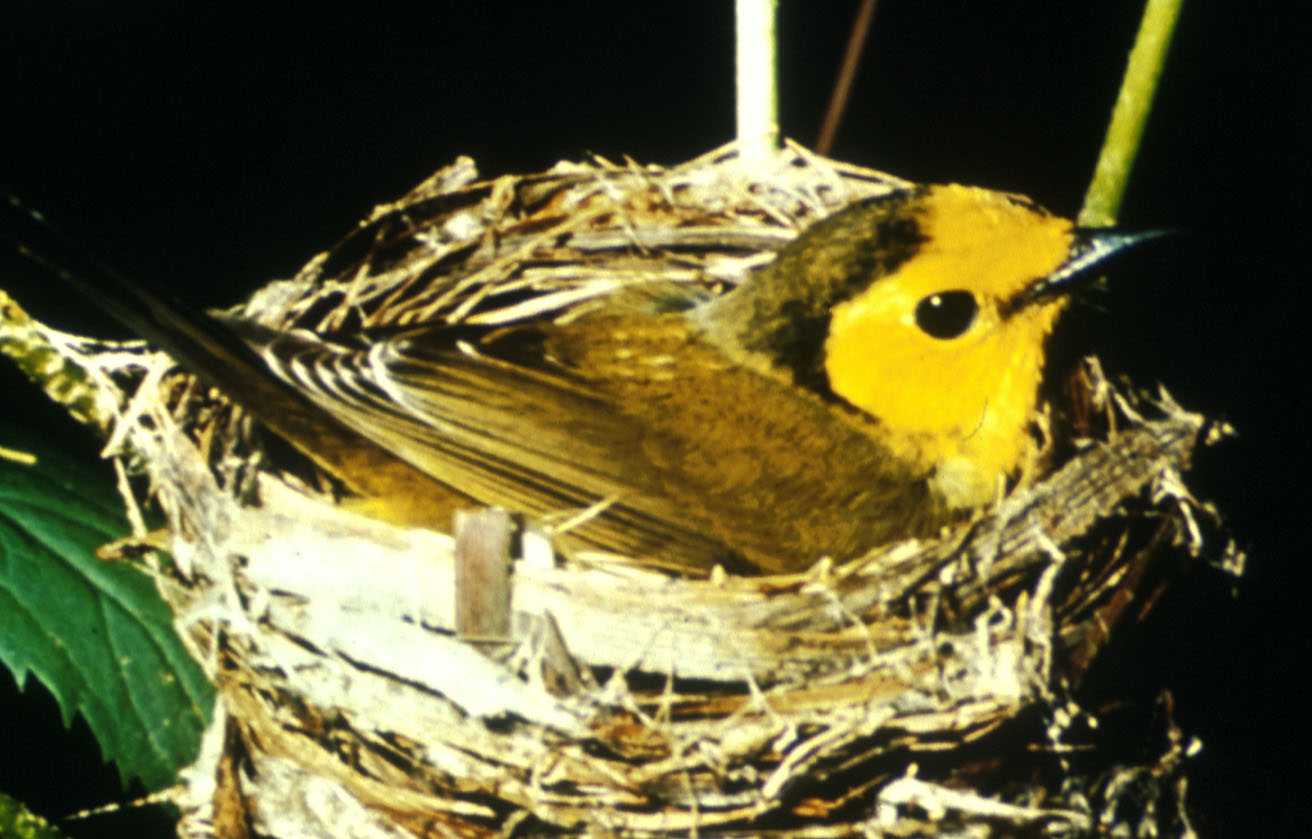
Female on nest
