= East Oak Lane, Philadelphia =

East Oak Lane
- Neighborhood of Philadelphia
- Location within Philadelphia
- Country: United States
- State: Pennsylvania
- County: Philadelphia
- City: Philadelphia
- Area codes: 215, 267 and 445

East Oak Lane is a neighborhood at the northern end of the North Philadelphia planning district of Philadelphia, Pennsylvania, United States. Many of the houses in the neighborhood are large single homes or twins built at a later period than much of central North Philadelphia. There is also a significant number of typical Philadelphia rowhouses.

== Boundaries ==
East Oak Lane is bounded towards the north by Cheltenham Avenue (the border between Philadelphia and Cheltenham Township), Broad Street towards the west, Godfrey Avenue towards the south, and towards the east by N. 5th street (as defined by the Oak Lane Community Action Association).

== Historical background ==
This area of Philadelphia was first settled in 1683 as William Penn's first neighborhood. In 1695, a Welshman named Griffith Miles bought 250 acres of land and built a log home along a dirt road that would later be known as Oak Lane. The area became known as Milestown in 1711, and as farming began to flourish, water-powered mills were built.

The road that came to define the neighborhood, initially called Martin's Mill Road, was renamed Oak Lane by a landowner in 1860, in remembrance of an ancient oak tree that had blown down in a storm.

== Milestown School ==
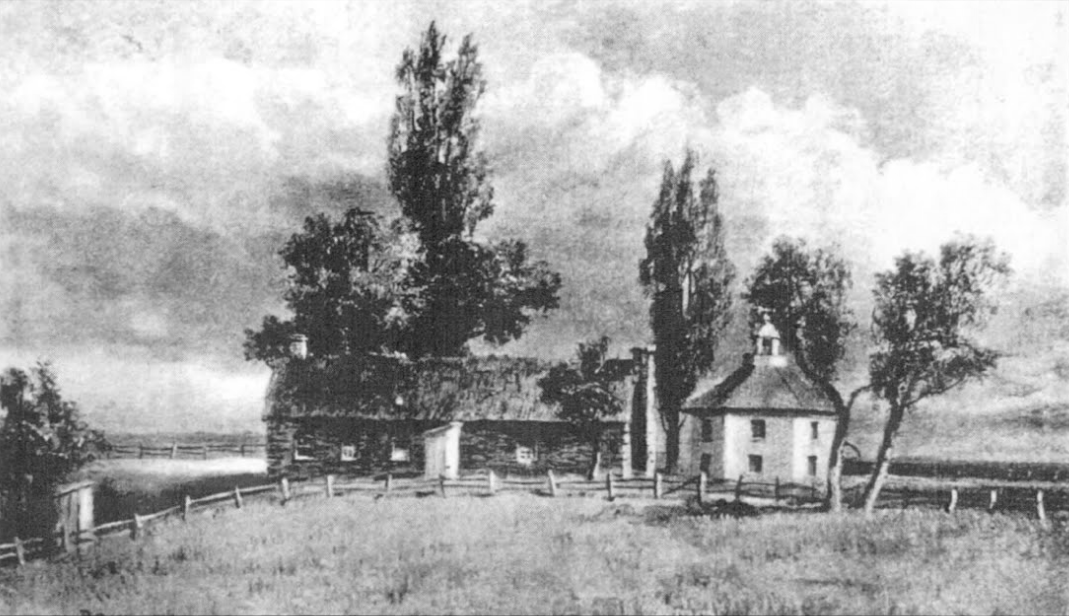
Painting of the original 1745 one-story building of the Milestown School and adjoining octagonal schoolhouse added in 1818

The first school building at what is now 12th and Oak Lane was a one-story schoolhouse, built in 1745 and donated in 1761 by Joseph Armitage to the trustees of what was then the Milestown School. Ornithologists Alexander Wilson and John Bachman were among the teachers there.

An octagonal schoolhouse was added in 1818. The building and grounds were given to the City of Philadelphia for a public school in 1866.

Ellwood School, an L-shaped elementary school building, was built in 1957 on the site of a previous 1875 schoolhouse, which replaced the original buildings of the Milestown School.

== Buildings and landmarks ==
Across the street from Ellwood School, the Oak Lane Branch of the Free Library of Philadelphia still operates in its historic 1910 building at the corner of 12th and Oak Lane, renovated in 1958 and 1999.

East Oak Lane is known for "large, elaborate houses of various styles" and "grand churches." Numerous architectural styles are visible, for example, in the area between 65th and 69th Avenues, with homes that have been the subjects of paintings by artist Chuck Connelly. Across the railroad tracks, a row of shops, most built in the second half of the 20th century, gives the impression of a small town Main Street.

== Demographics and notable people ==
In addition to its architectural diversity, East Oak Lane has long been known for being racially and ethnically diverse.

Notable past residents have included:

- Noam Chomsky, linguist and political theorist who grew up in East Oak Lane on Fairhill Street. While Chomsky described his family as being, in the 1930s and 1940s, "the only Jewish family in a mostly Irish and German Catholic neighborhood", he attended the nearby Oak Lane Country Day School, a "progressive and lively K-8 private school [whose] students were for the most part Jewish".
- Vivian Green, singer-songwriter and pianist
- Leslie Odom Jr., Tony Award-winning actor who originated the role of Aaron Burr in the 2015 Broadway musical Hamilton
- Hugh Panaro, actor who played the title role in The Phantom of the Opera on Broadway for over eight years between 1999 and 2014
