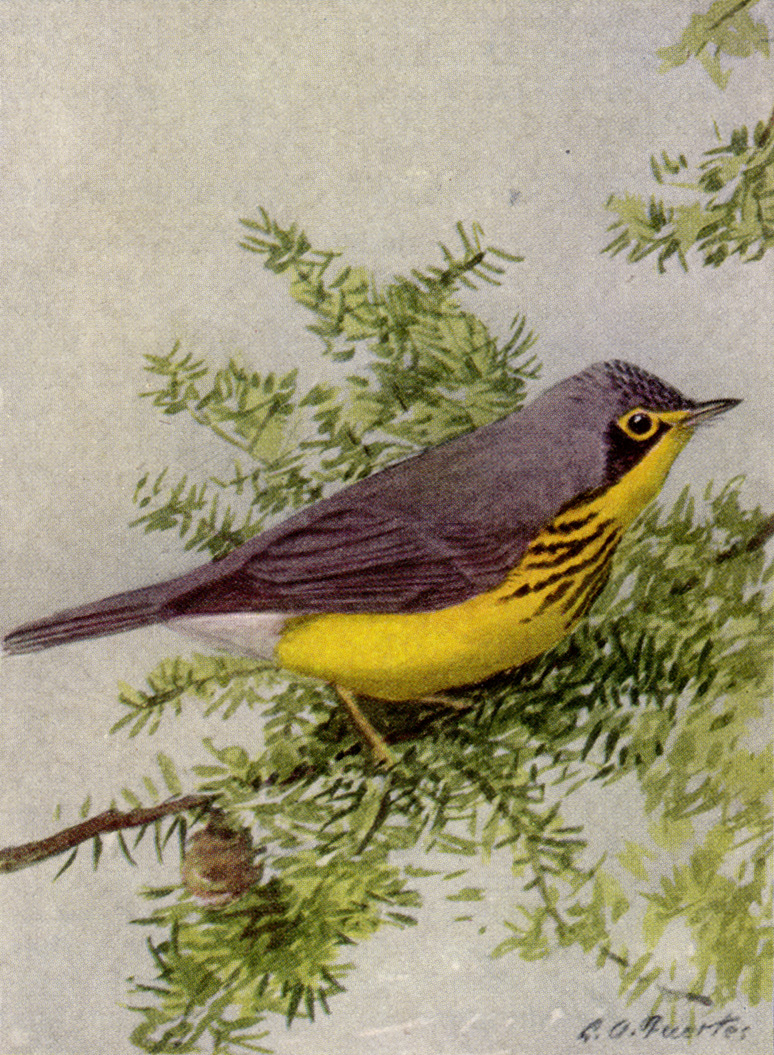
- Canada warbler

Scientific classification
- Kingdom: Animalia
- Phylum: Chordata
- Class: Aves
- Order: Passeriformes
- Family: Parulidae
- Genus: Wilsonia; Bonaparte, 1838

Species
- Wilsonia citrina Wilsonia pusilla Wilsonia canadensis

= Wilsonia (bird) =

Former genus of birds

Wilsonia was a formerly recognized genus of New World warblers.

The three species formerly included in Wilsonia, all since transferred to other genera, are:

- Hooded warbler, Wilsonia citrina, now Setophaga citrina
- Wilson's warbler, Wilsonia pusilla, now Cardellina pusilla
- Canada warbler, Wilsonia canadensis, now Cardellina canadensis

== Taxonomy ==
Some authorities previously suggested that the genus Wilsonia should include the red-faced warbler, which is generally put in the genus Cardellina. Genetic research has however indicated that the type species of Wilsonia, the hooded warbler, is only distantly related to Wilson's and Canada warblers, and is instead closely related to the type species of Setophaga (American redstart S. ruticilla). As the name Setophaga (published in 1827) takes priority over Wilsonia (published in 1838), hooded warbler has accordingly been transferred to Setophaga. The other two former Wilsonia species are indeed closely related to the red-faced warbler, and have thus been transferred to Cardellina. These changes have been universally accepted among relevant regional and global checklists, including by the North American Classification Committee of the AOU and the IOC.

This genus was named to commemorate the American ornithologist Alexander Wilson.
