= Alexander Wilson (ornithologist) =

Scottish-American poet, ornithologist, naturalist, and illustrator (1766-1813)

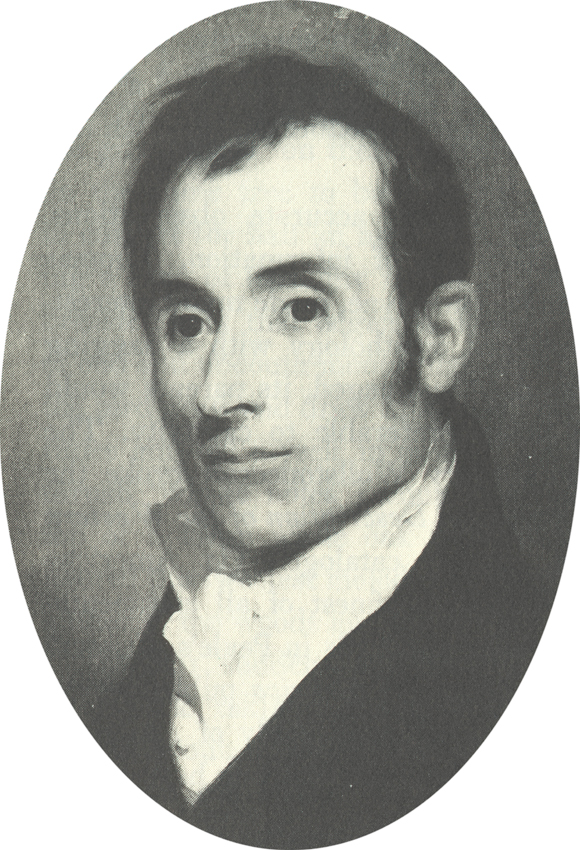
- Alexander Wilson
- Born: July 6, 1766; Paisley, Scotland
- Died: August 23, 1813 (aged 47); Philadelphia, Pennsylvania, United States
- Scientific career
- Fields: naturalist
- Author abbrev. (zoology): Wilson

Alexander Wilson (July 6, 1766 – August 23, 1813) was a Scottish-American poet, ornithologist, naturalist, and illustrator. Identified by George Ord as the "Father of American Ornithology", Wilson is regarded as the greatest American ornithologist before Audubon.

== Biography ==
=== Early life ===
Wilson was born in a Presbyterian family in Paisley, Scotland on July 6, 1766. Alexander senior ("Saunders") had given up smuggling and taken up weaving where he did well and he supplemented income with liquor distilling. The American revolution had caused economic hardship and after the death of Wilson's mother, Mary McNab, his father remarried and moved to Auchinbathie. Wilson got a little bit of schooling but spent time herding livestock and at thirteen he apprenticed with his brother-in-law William Duncan. He also worked four years as a journeyman, shooting grouse in free time and peddling wares across Scotland.

=== Poetry and emigration ===
While working as a weaver in Paisley, Wilson became seriously interested in poetry. He was inspired by the dialect verse of Robert Burns, who was only seven years older. He was close friends with fellow Paisley poet Ebenezer Picken.

In addition to ballads and pastoral pieces, Wilson wrote satirical commentary on the conditions of weavers in the mills. In 1792 he wrote a poem called "Watty and Meg: A wife reformed" on a drunkard and his wife, which was quite popular. His authorship of a satirical poem "The Shark, or Lang Mills Detected" with severe personal statements about a mill owner named William Sharp resulted in a libel suit. He then began to blackmail Sharp and this led to Wilson's arrest. His work was said to be inflammatory, against the English, and libelous; he was often in trouble with the law. Because he devoted little time to his trade as a weaver, Wilson lived in poverty. In 1794, he decided to emigrate to America.

=== From teaching to ornithology ===
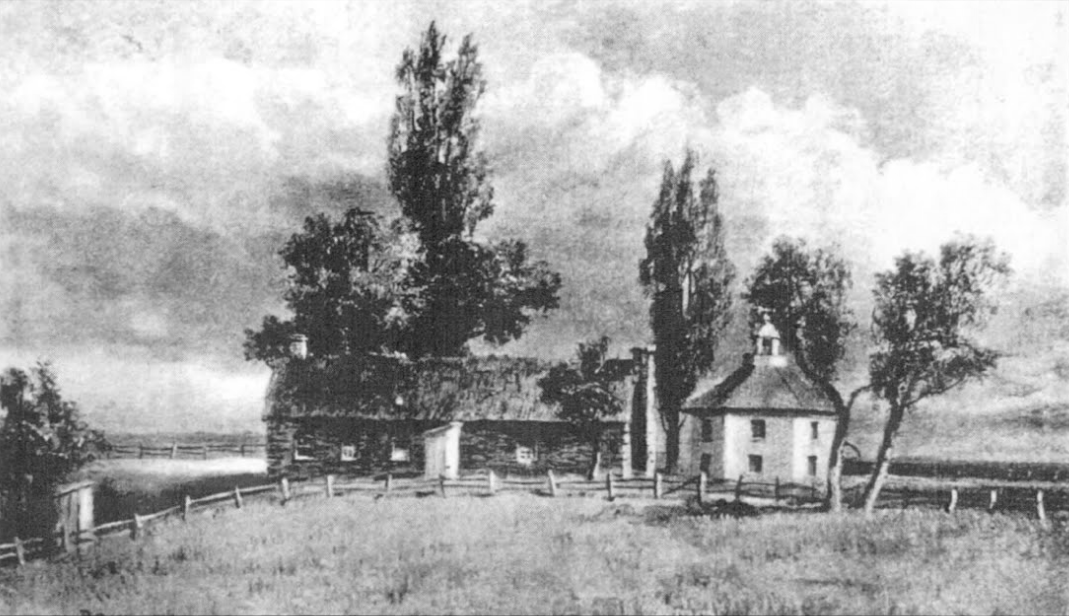
Milestown School in the 19th century

With a nephew, Wilson left Scotland in May 1794 at the age of 27 and landed in Delaware. He walked to Philadelphia where he tried work in printing and weaving. Opportunities were scarce for weavers in the Philadelphia area, and Wilson turned to teaching.

Wilson taught at the Milestown School in Bristol Township, the present-day East Oak Lane neighborhood of Philadelphia, for five years from 1796 to 1801. He then moved on to teach briefly in New Jersey.

Eventually, Wilson settled into a position at Gray's Ferry, Pennsylvania, and took up residence in nearby Kingsessing. There, he met the famous naturalist William Bartram, who encouraged Wilson's interest in ornithology and painting.

Resolved to publish a collection of illustrations of all the birds of North America, Wilson traveled widely, collecting and painting. He also secured subscribers to fund his work, the nine-volume American Ornithology (1808–1814), which was published by Bradford & Inskeep, booksellers in Philadelphia. Wilson's primary engraver was Alexander Lawson (c.1773–1846), who completed 50 (60%) of the copper plates used to produce the hand-colored prints (76 total) that were interleaved in each volume. Of the 268 species of birds described in its pages, 26 had not previously been described. His illustrations of birds in poses were an inspiration for James Audubon and other illustrators and naturalists.

In 1813, Wilson was elected a member of the American Philosophical Society.

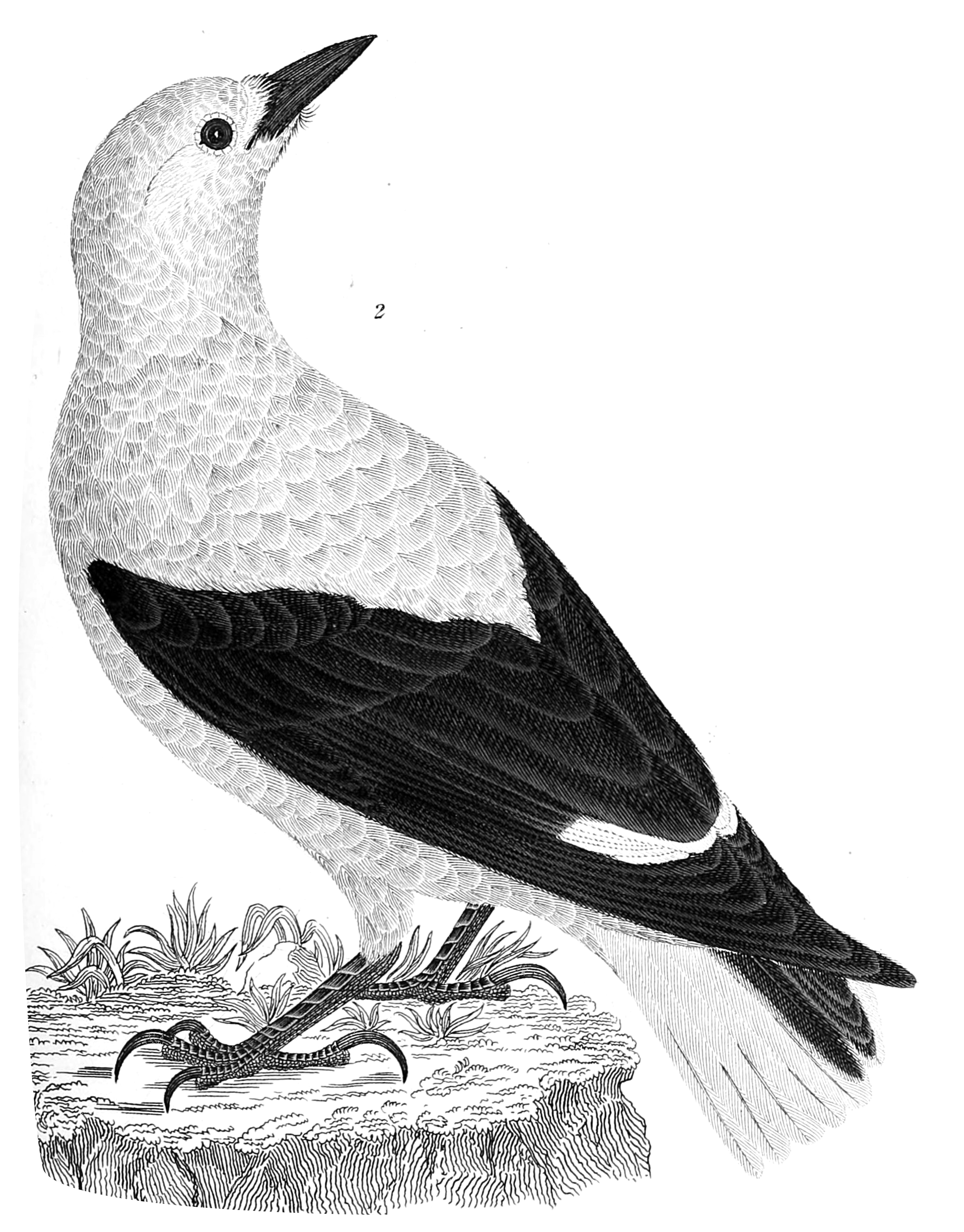
Illustration of Clark's nutcracker by Wilson

=== Death ===
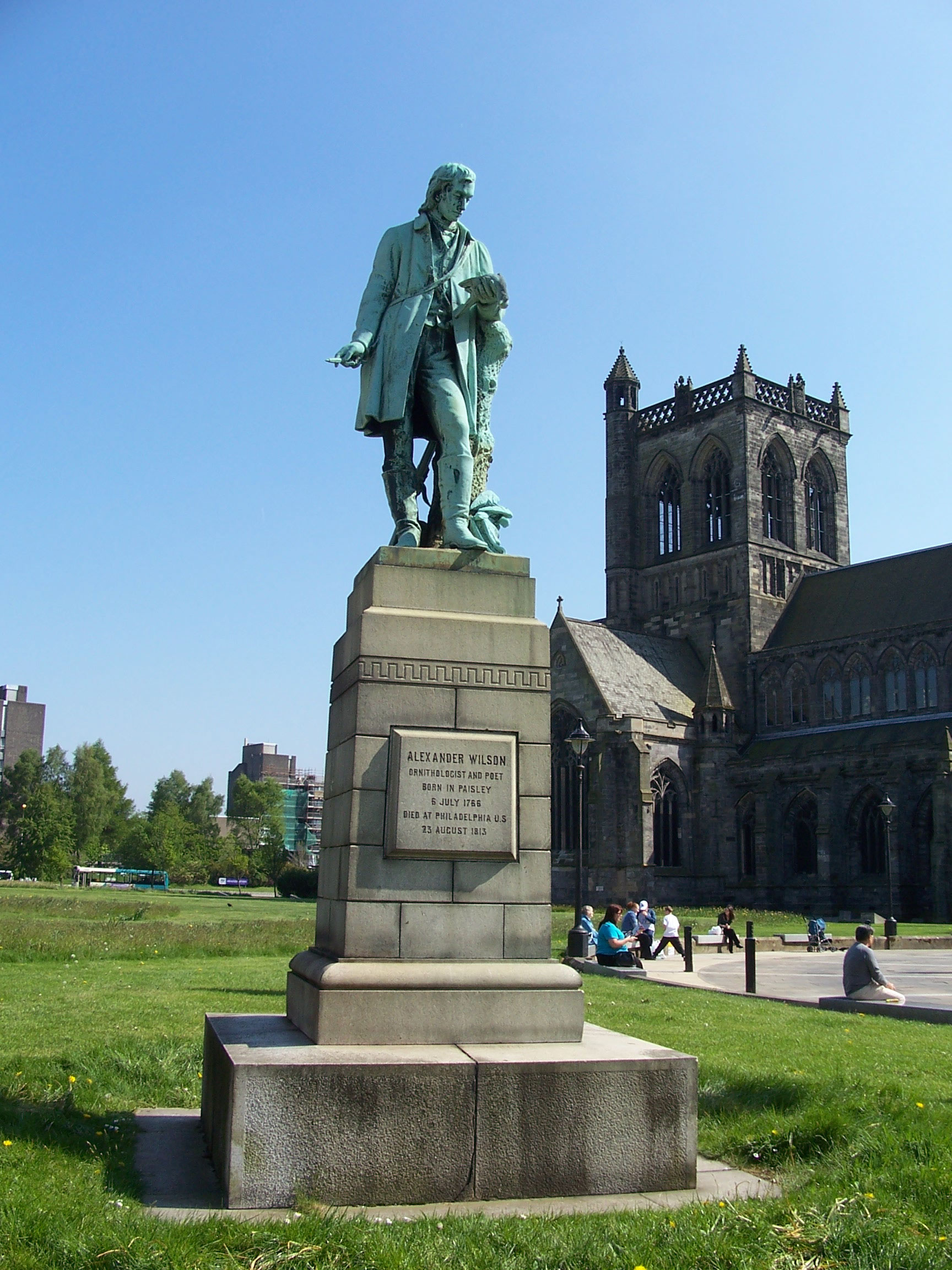
Wilson statue at Paisley Abbey

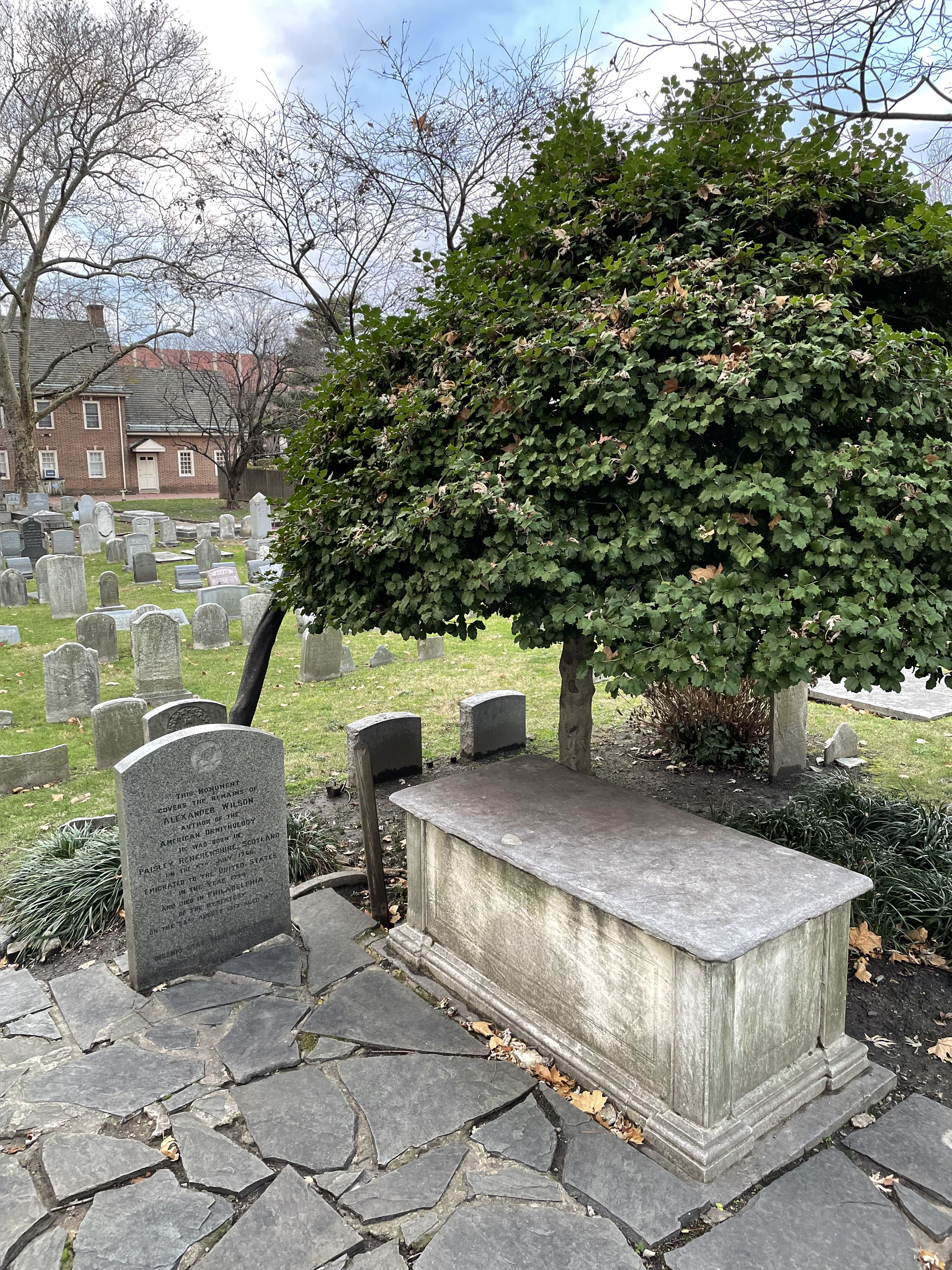
The gravesite of Alexander Wilson (1766–1813) at the Gloria Dei (Old Swedes) cemetery, Philadelphia, Pennsylvania, USA (17 December 2022).

Wilson died on August 23, 1813, "of dysentery, overwork, and chronic poverty" according to one report. He was buried in Philadelphia, in the cemetery at Gloria Dei (Old Swedes') church. The two final volumes of American Ornithology were completed by Wilson's friend and patron George Ord, who was an executor of Wilson's estate.

An image entitled "Swedish Lutheran Church", which depicts an apparently elderly individual mourning at the grave of Wilson, was drawn by Thomas Sully (1783–1872), engraved and printed in 1828 by Cephas G. Childs and B. Rogers, respectively, and published in a book of landscapes, Views of Philadelphia (1827–1830).

== Legacy ==
In Paisley, a statue of Wilson was erected on the grounds of Paisley Abbey. A memorial on the banks of River Cart, near the Hammills rapids and waterfall, commemorates Wilson's connection to that city. The memorial is inscribed "Remember Alexander Wilson 1766–1813. Here was his boyhood playground."

A genus of warblers, Wilsonia (now obsolete), was named for Wilson by Charles Lucien Bonaparte. Several species of bird were also named in honor of Wilson, including the Wilson's storm-petrel, Wilson's plover, Wilson's phalarope, Wilson's snipe, and Wilson's warbler. In 2023, the American Ornithological Society decided to rename Wilson's warbler and Wilson's snipe.

According to an article about his life, Wilson's meeting with James Audubon "probably inspired Audubon to publish his own book on birds, and he also influenced many later artists and ornithologists".

The Wilson Journal of Ornithology and the Wilson Ornithological Society also bear his name.

== Gallery ==
American Ornithology, Vol. 1, Plate 1

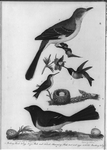
Illustration from American Ornithology

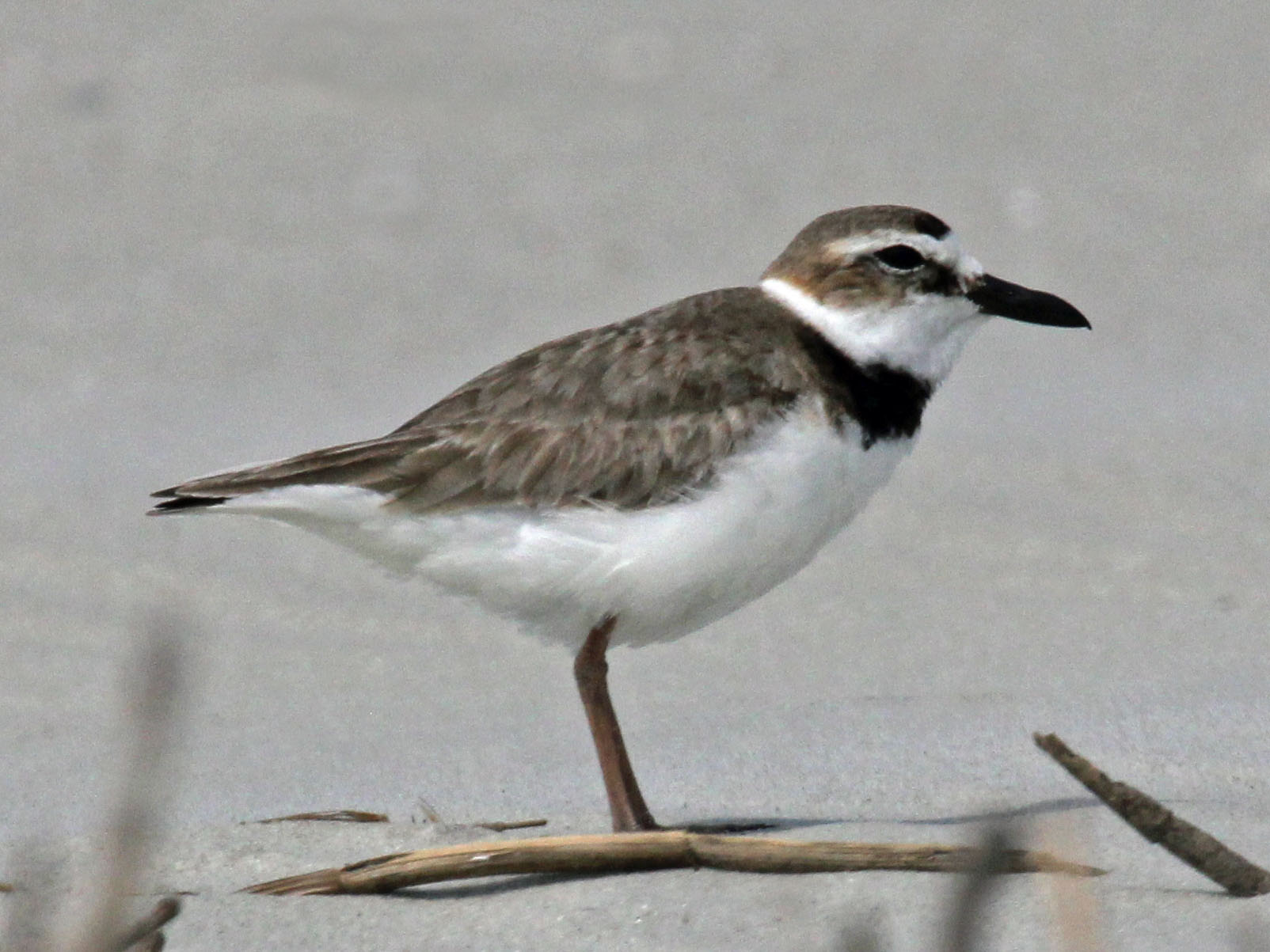
Wilson's plover (Charadrius wilsonia)

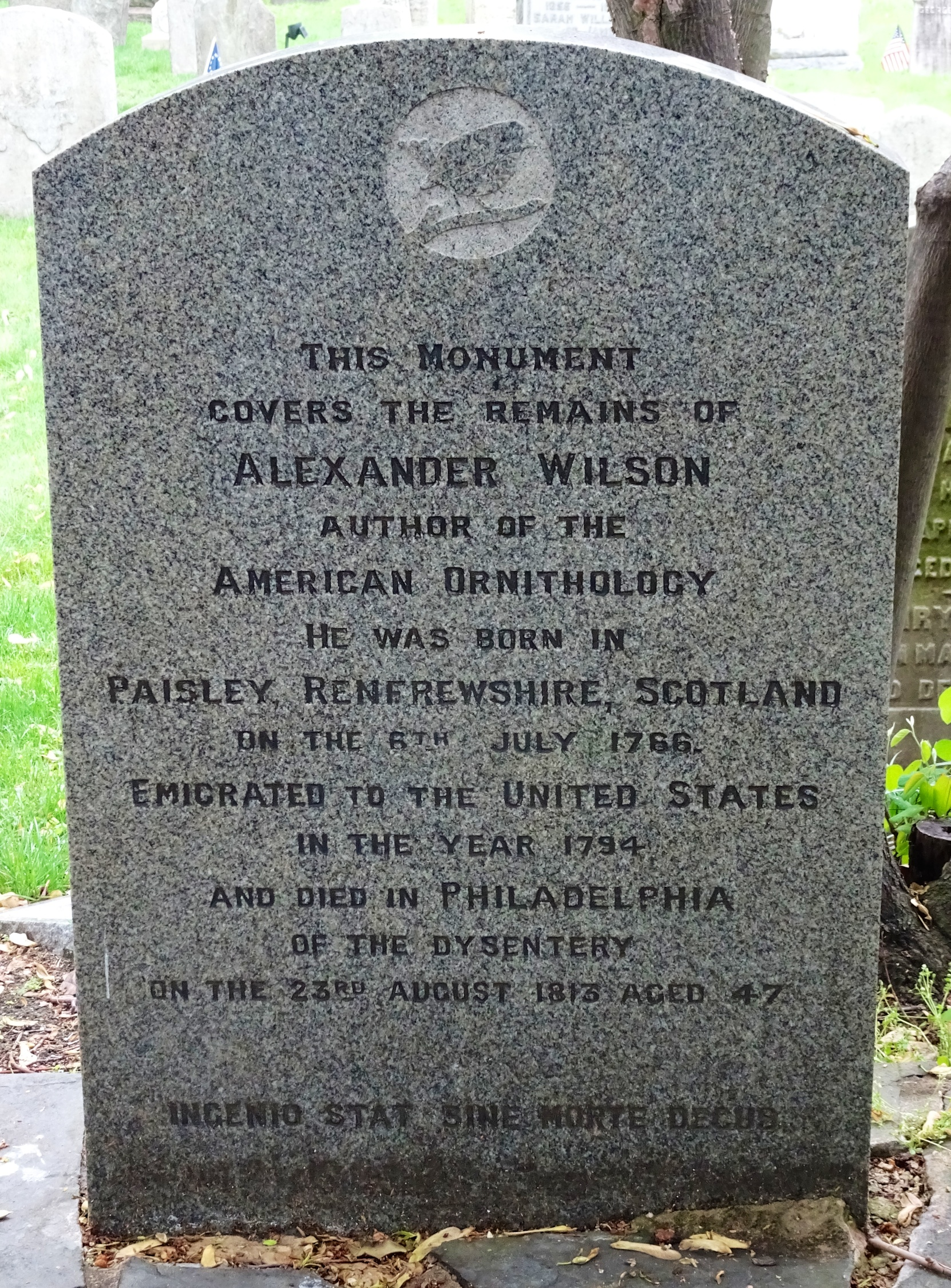
Replacement headstone at Wilson's grave in Philadelphia

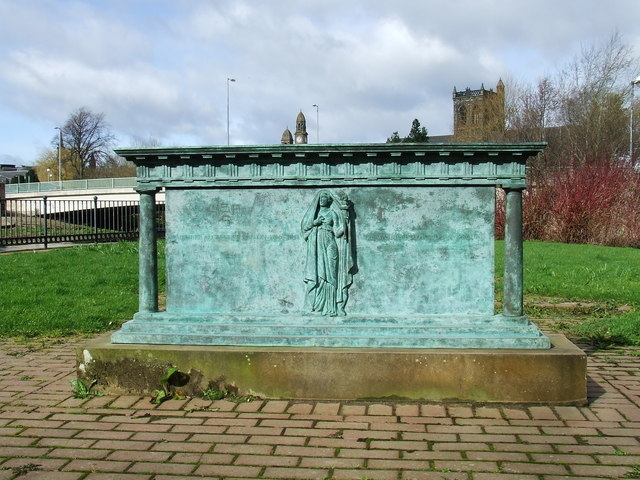
Memorial in Paisley near the River Cart

== Published works ==
- Wilson, Alexander. n.d. The tears of Britain. A poem. OCLC: 166684875.
- Wilson, Alexander. 1808–1814. American Ornithology; or, the Natural History of the Birds of the United States: Illustrated with Plates Engraved and Colored from Original drawings taken from Nature.
- Wilson, Alexander. 1800. List of pieces written by Mr. Alexander Wilson, now in Philadelphia. [Paisley, Scotland]: Printed by Andrew Young. At head of title: Paisley repository. No. VIII. Probable decade of imprint from NSTC. "The American blue bird [by A. Wilson, in verse]": p. 2-3; "The Baltimore bird [by A. Wilson, part in verse]": p. 4.
- Wilson, Alexander. 1800. Watty and Meg: or the wife reclaimed, together with : Habbie Sampson and his wife or, a new way of raising the wind : Donald and his dog : the West Kintra weaver turned teetotaler : the Loss o' the pack : John Tamson's cart : Takin' it out o' his mouth. Paisley, Scotland: W. Wilson.
- Wilson, Alexander. 1800. Rab and Ringan: a tale as delivered in the Pantheon, Edinburgh by the author of Watty and Meg; to which is added The twa cats and the cheese, a tale. Glasgow: Brash & Reid.
- Wilson, Alexander. 1801. Oration, on the power and value of national liberty delivered to a large assembly of citizens, at Milestown, Pennsylvania, on Wednesday, March 4, 1801. Philadelphia: Printed by H. Maxwell. Reprinted in Early American imprints. Second series;, no. 1668.
- Wilson, Alexander. Papers, 1806–1813. Philadelphia: American Philosophical Society. This material relates to Alexander B. Grosart's biography of Wilson. There are notes and copies of letters and documents, including a copy of Wilson's will. There is one poem by Wilson, "The Last Wish," and an 1806 letter to William Bartram.
- Wilson, Alexander. 1814. The Foresters: A Poem, Descriptive of a Pedestrian Journey to the Falls of Niagara in the Autumn of 1804. Newtown (PA): S. Siegfried & J. Wilson. Also published in the magazine The Port Folio in 1809/1810.

== See also ==
- List of 18th-century British working-class writers
