= List of birds of Georgia (U.S. state) =

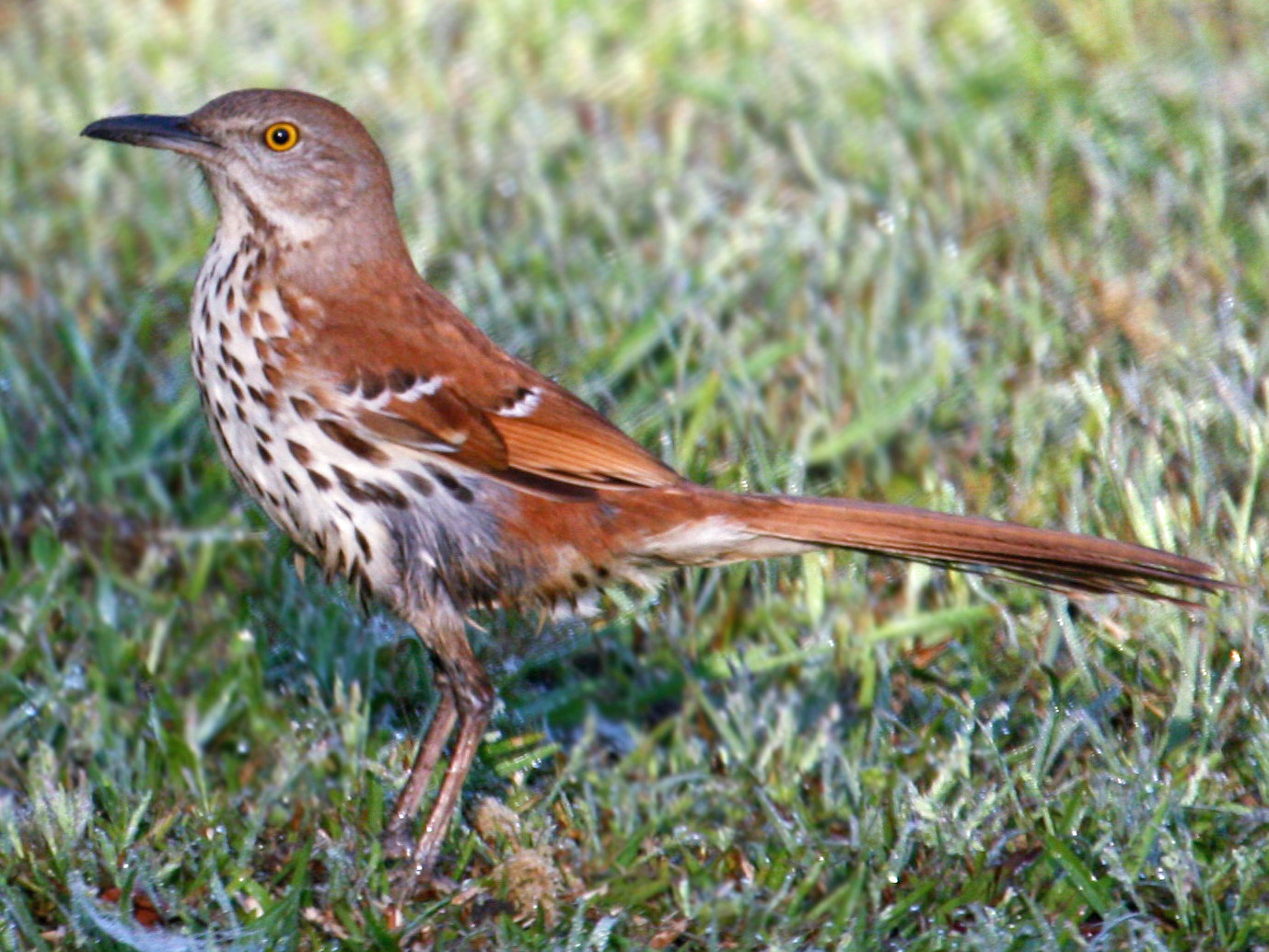
The brown thrasher is the state bird of Georgia.

This list of birds of Georgia includes species documented in the U.S. state of Georgia and accepted by the Checklist and Records Committee of the Georgia Ornithological Society (GOSRC). As of August 2020, there are 427 species definitively included in the official list. Seven additional species are on the list but classed as provisional (see definitions below). Of the 427 species, 100 are classed as rare, four have been introduced to North America, and one is extinct. (Another, the ivory-billed woodpecker, is classed by the GOSRC as rare, but is arguably extinct. See its species account for the controversy surrounding this bird.) Additional accidental species have been added from different sources.

This list is presented in the taxonomic sequence of the Check-list of North and Middle American Birds, 7th edition through the 62nd Supplement, published by the American Ornithological Society (AOS). Common and scientific names are also those of the Check-list, except that the common names of families are from the Clements taxonomy because the AOS list does not include them.

Unless otherwise noted, all species listed below are considered to occur regularly in Georgia as permanent residents, summer or winter visitors, or migrants. The following tags are used to designate some species:

- (R) – Rare – a species whose report is reviewable by the GOSRC
- (I) – Introduced – a species introduced to North America by humans, either directly or indirectly
- (E) – Extinct – a recent species that no longer exists
- (P) – Provisional list – "species with fewer than 4 accepted sight records" per the GOSRC

== Ducks, geese, and waterfowl ==
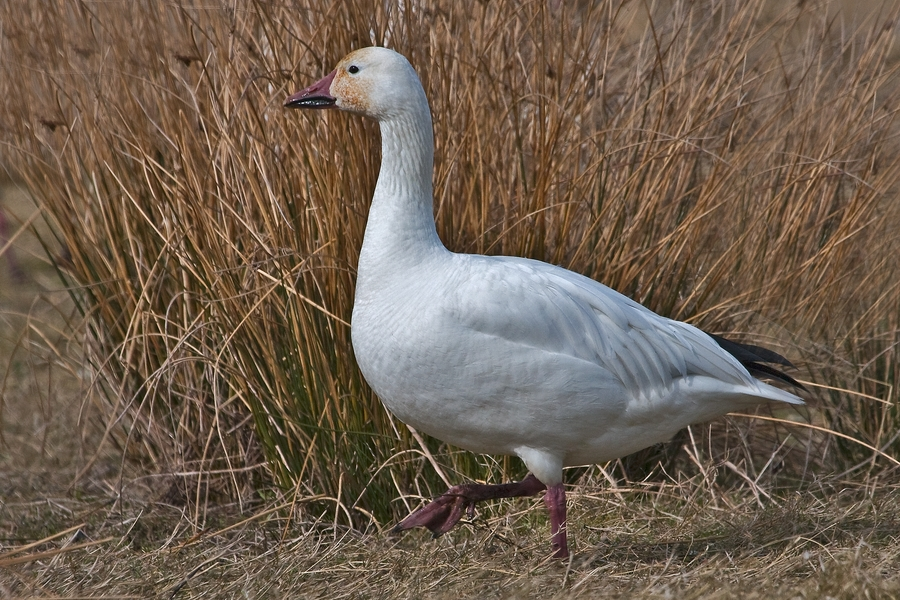
Snow goose

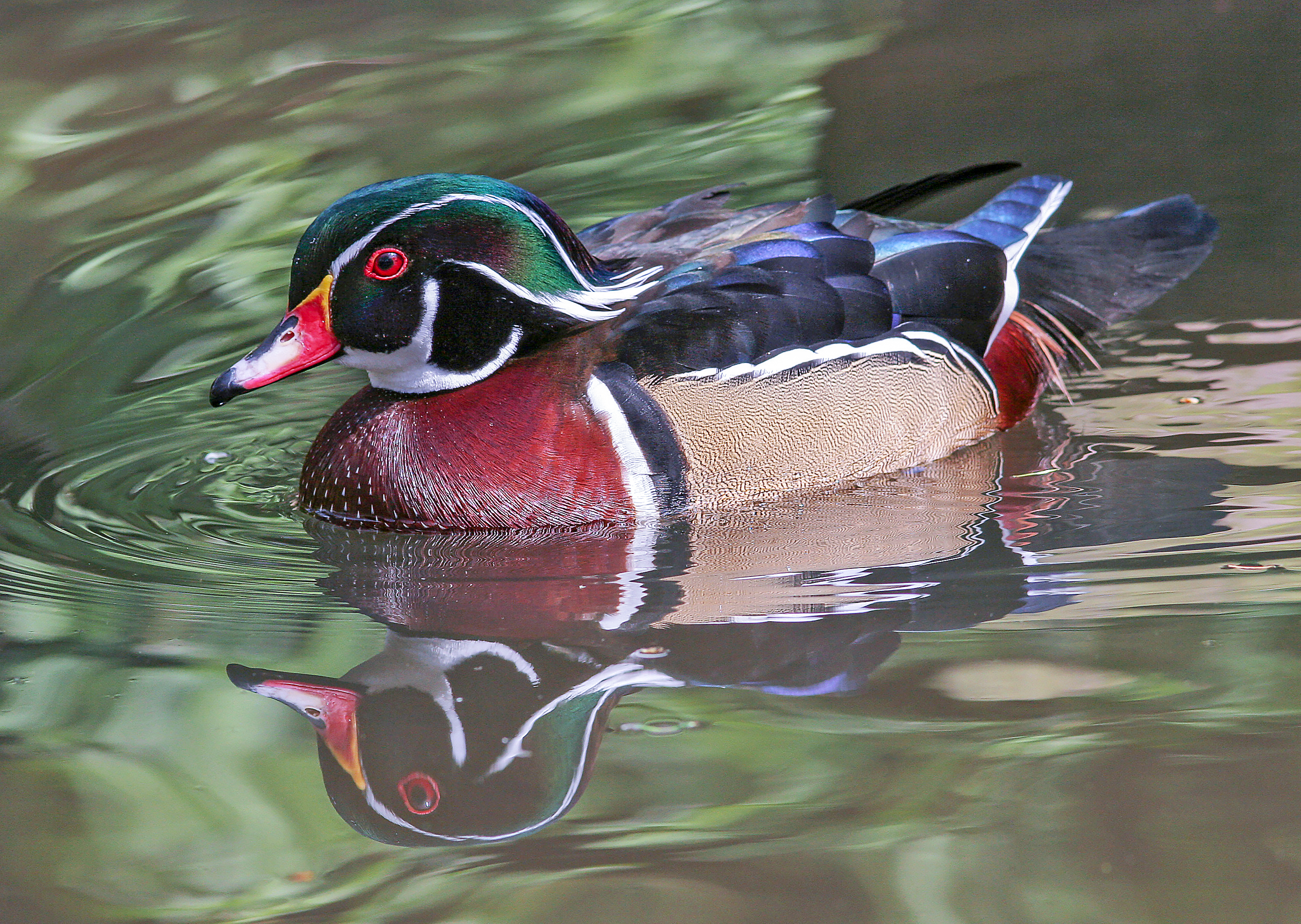
Wood duck

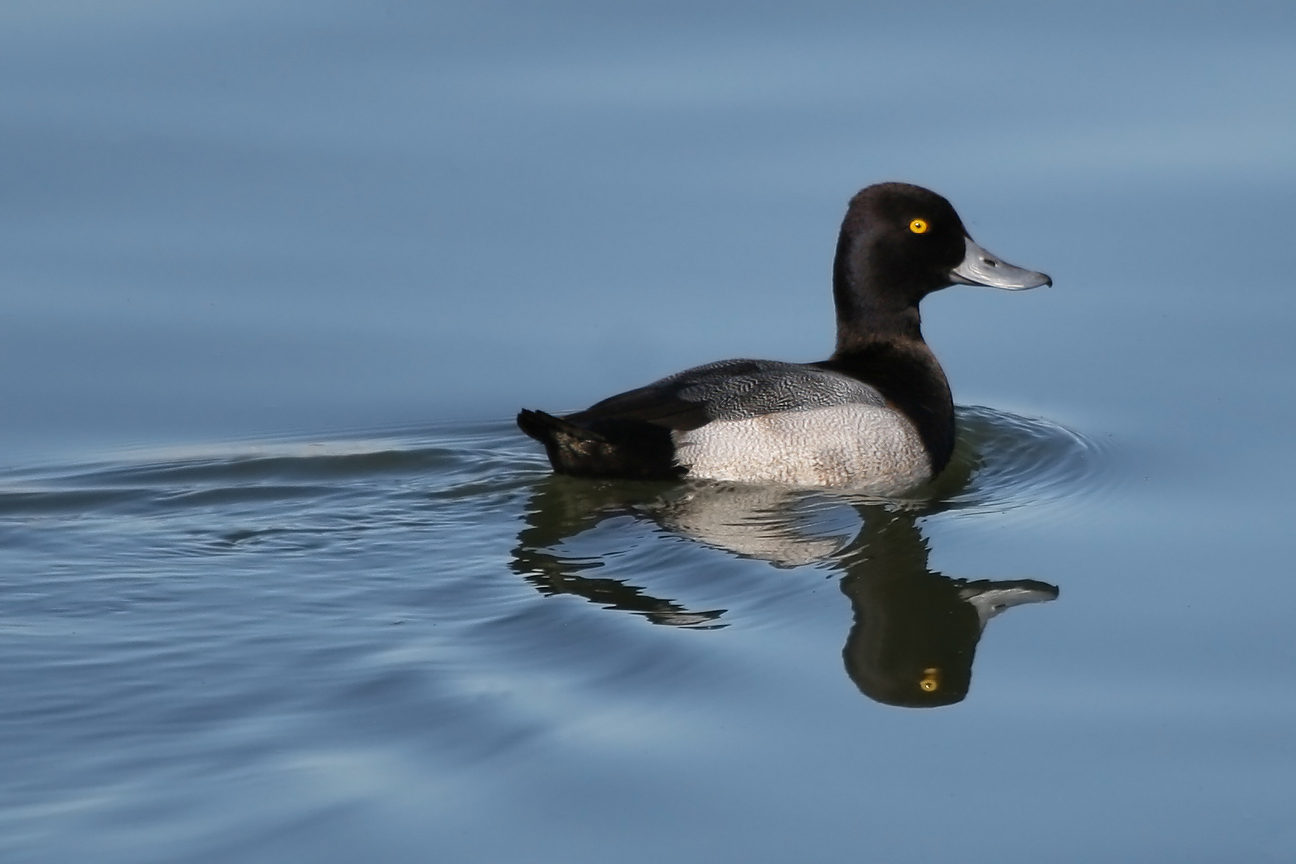
Lesser scaup

Order: Anseriformes Family: Anatidae

The family Anatidae includes the ducks and most duck-like waterfowl, such as geese and swans. These are birds that are adapted for an aquatic existence with webbed feet, bills that are flattened to a greater or lesser extent, and feathers that are excellent at shedding water due to special oils. Forty-one species of Anatidae have been recorded in Georgia.

- Black-bellied whistling-duck, Dendrocygna autumnalis
- Fulvous whistling-duck, Dendrocygna bicolor (R)
- Snow goose, Anser caerulescens
- Ross's goose, Anser rossii
- Greater white-fronted goose, Anser albifrons
- Brant, Branta bernicla (R)
- Barnacle goose, Branta leucopsis (accidental)
- Cackling goose, Branta hutchinsii (R)
- Canada goose, Branta canadensis
- Trumpeter swan, Cygnus buccinator (R)
- Tundra swan, Cygnus columbianus
- Whooper swan, Cygnus cygnus (accidental)
- Wood duck, Aix sponsa
- Blue-winged teal, Spatula discors
- Cinnamon teal, Spatula cyanoptera (R)
- Northern shoveler, Spatula clypeata
- Gadwall, Mareca strepera
- Eurasian wigeon, Mareca penelope (R)
- American wigeon, Mareca americana
- Mallard, Anas platyrhynchos
- American black duck, Anas rubripes
- Mottled duck, Anas fulvigula
- Northern pintail, Anas acuta
- Green-winged teal, Anas crecca carolinensis
- Canvasback, Aythya valisineria
- Redhead, Aythya americana
- Ring-necked duck, Aythya collaris
- Greater scaup, Aythya marila
- Lesser scaup, Aythya affinis
- King eider, Somateria spectabilis (R)
- Common eider, Somateria mollissima (R)
- Harlequin duck, Histrionicus histrionicus (R)
- Surf scoter, Melanitta perspicillata
- White-winged scoter, Melanitta deglandi
- Black scoter, Melanitta americana
- Long-tailed duck, Clangula hyemalis
- Bufflehead, Bucephala albeola
- Common goldeneye, Bucephala clangula
- Hooded merganser, Lophodytes cucullatus
- Common merganser, Mergus merganser (R)
- Red-breasted merganser, Mergus serrator
- Masked duck, Nomonyx dominicus (R)
- Ruddy duck, Oxyura jamaicensis

== Guans, chachalacas, and curassows ==
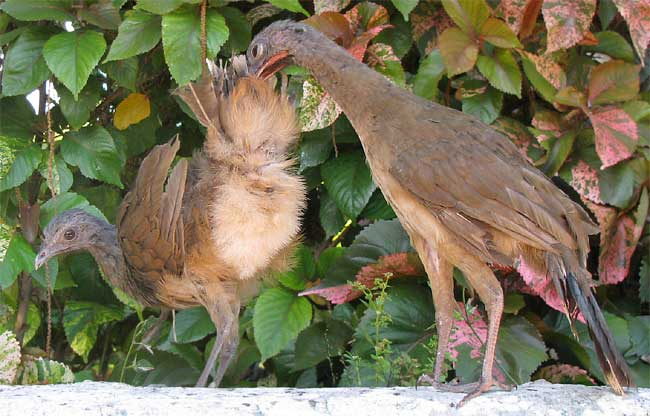
Plain chachalacas

Order: Galliformes Family: Cracidae

The chachalacas are tropical fowl native to the Neotropics, only entering into southern Texas in their native range. They were introduced to Sapelo, Blackbeard and Little St. Simons Islands in 1923.

- Plain chachalaca, Ortalis vetula (I)

== New World quail ==
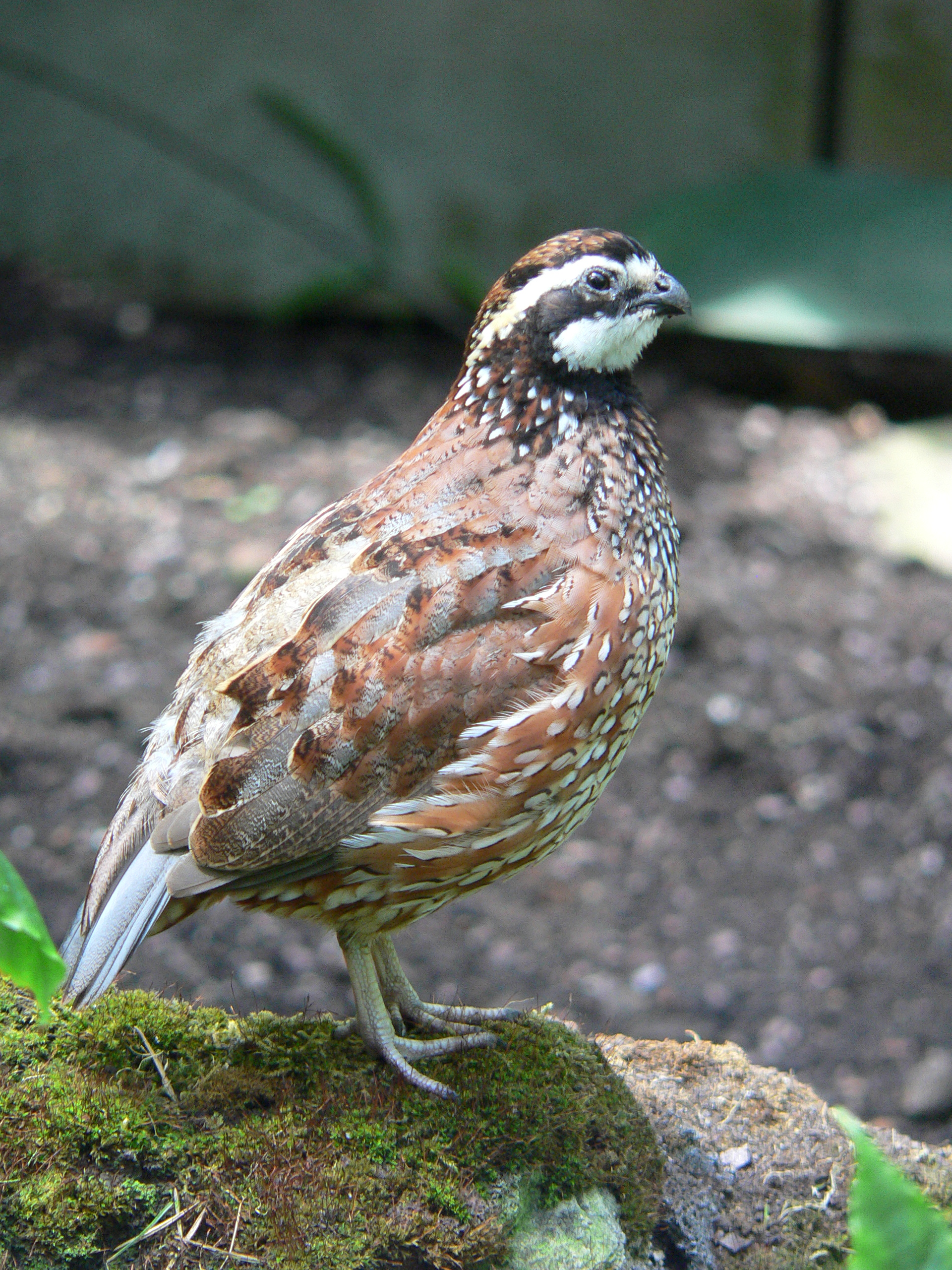
Northern bobwhite

Order: Galliformes Family: Odontophoridae

The New World quails are small, plump terrestrial birds only distantly related to the quails of the Old World, but named for their similar appearance and habits. Only one species of New World quail has been recorded in Georgia

- Northern bobwhite, Colinus virginianus

== Pheasants, grouse, and allies ==
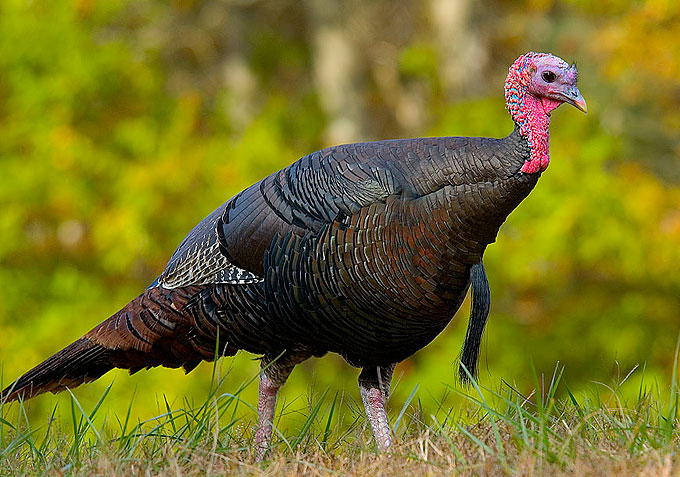
Wild turkey

Order: Galliformes Family: Phasianidae

The Phasianidae is the family containing the pheasants and related species. These are terrestrial birds, variable in size but generally plump, with broad, relatively short wings. Many are gamebirds or have been domesticated as a food source for humans. Two species of Phasianidae have been recorded in Georgia.

- Wild turkey, Meleagris gallopavo
- Ruffed grouse, Bonasa umbellus

== Grebes ==
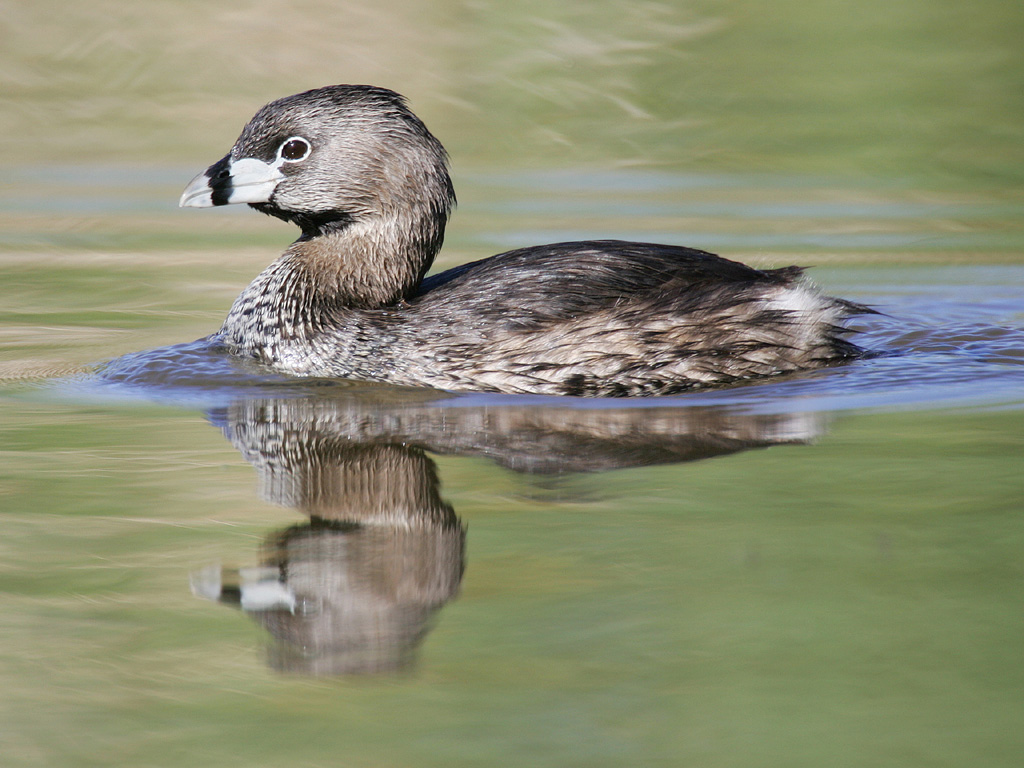
Pied-billed grebe

Order: Podicipediformes Family: Podicipedidae

Grebes are small to medium-large freshwater diving birds. They have lobed toes and are excellent swimmers and divers. However, they have their feet placed far back on the body, making them quite ungainly on land. Five species of grebe have been recorded in Georgia.

- Pied-billed grebe, Podilymbus podiceps
- Horned grebe, Podiceps auritus
- Red-necked grebe, Podiceps grisegena
- Eared grebe, Podiceps nigricollis
- Western grebe, Aechmorphorus occidentalis (R)

== Pigeons and doves ==
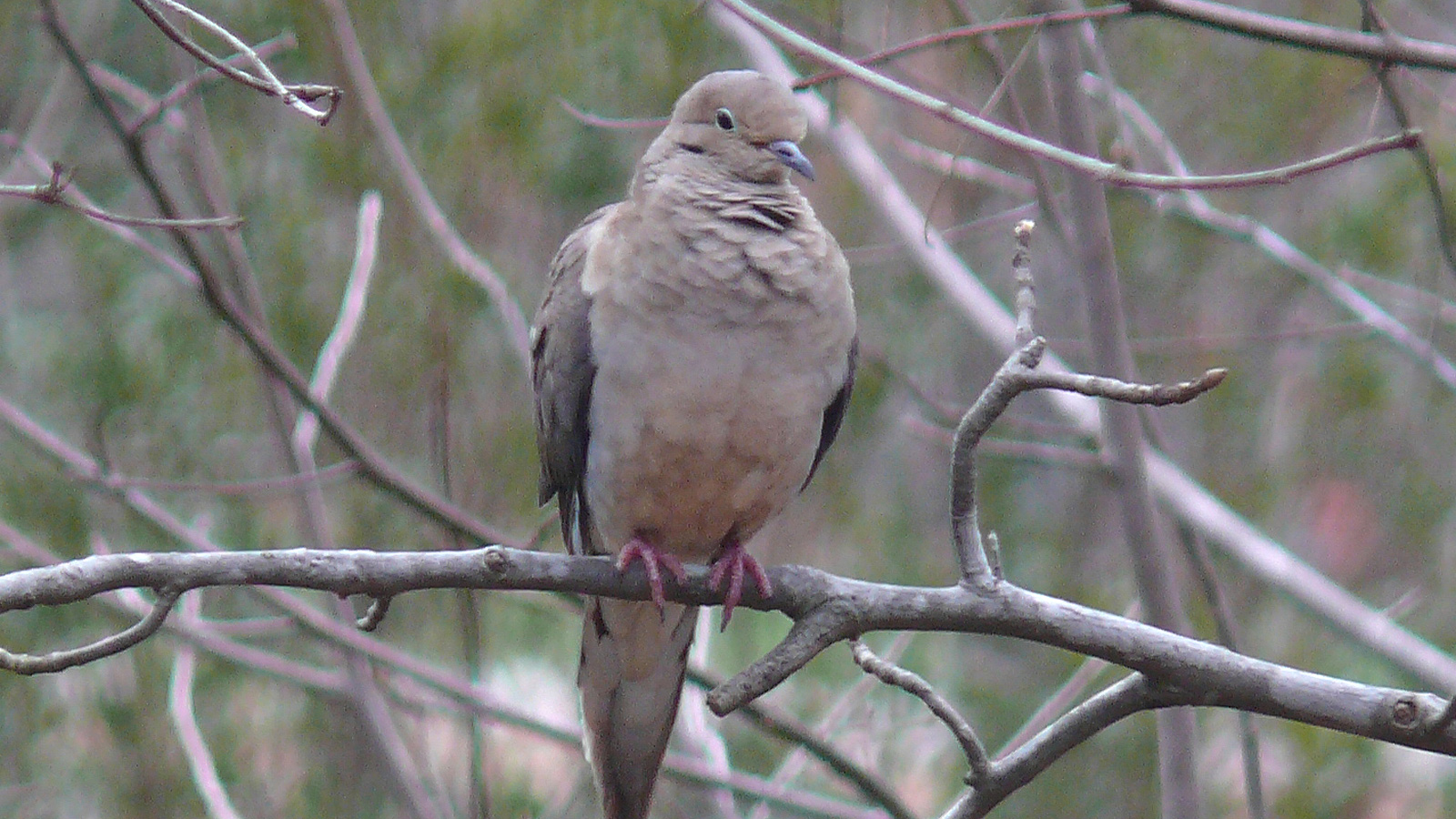
Mourning dove

Order: Columbiformes Family: Columbidae

Pigeons and doves are stout-bodied birds with short necks and short slender bills with a fleshy cere. Seven species of columbidae have been recorded in Georgia.

- Rock pigeon, Columba livia (I)
- Eurasian collared-dove, Streptopelia decaocto (I)
- Inca dove, Columbina inca (R)
- Passenger pigeon, Ectopistes migratorius (E)
- Common ground dove, Columbina passerina
- White-winged dove, Zenaida asiatica
- Mourning dove, Zenaida macroura

== Cuckoos ==
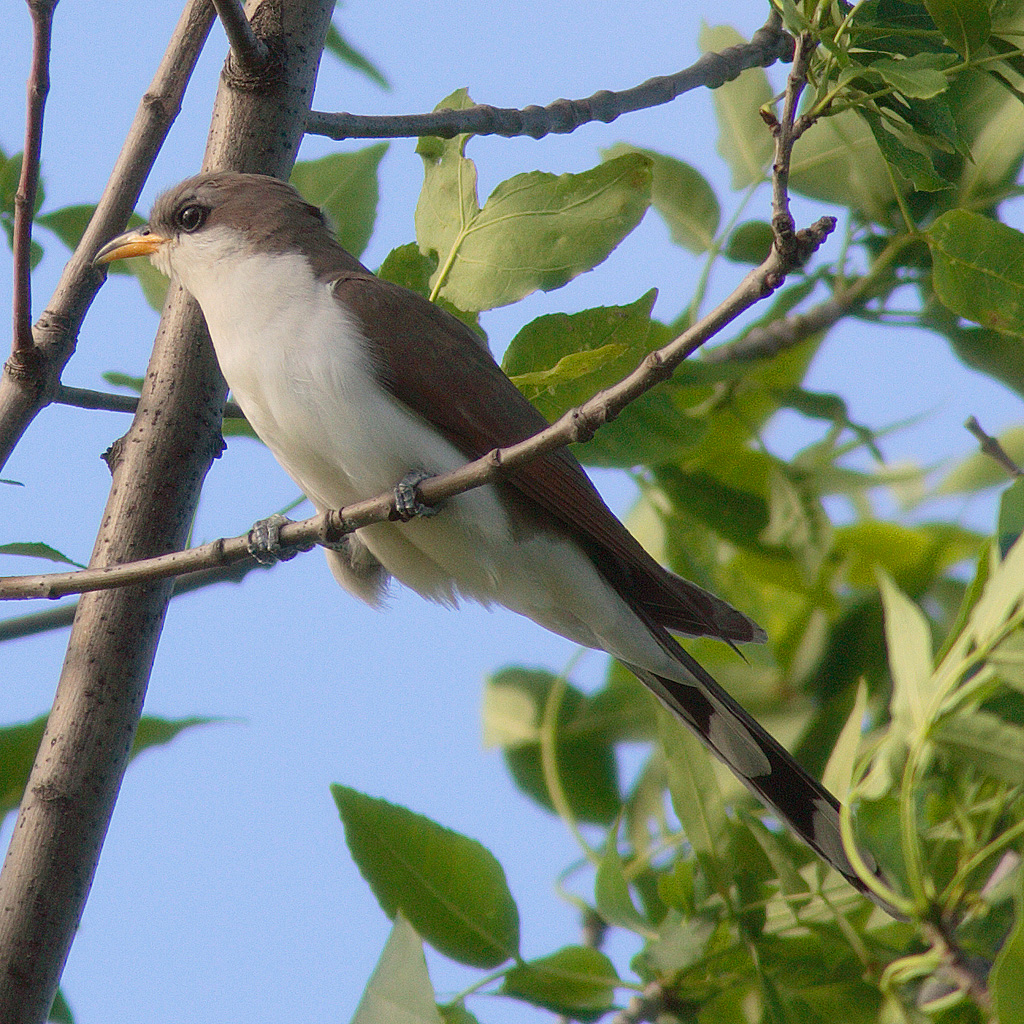
Yellow-billed cuckoo

Order: Cuculiformes Family: Cuculidae

The family Cuculidae includes cuckoos, roadrunners, and anis. These birds are of variable size with slender bodies, long tails, and strong legs. Three species of cuckoo have been recorded in Georgia.

- Smooth-billed ani, Crotophaga ani (R)
- Yellow-billed cuckoo, Coccyzus americanus
- Black-billed cuckoo, Coccyzus erythropthalmus

== Nightjars and allies ==
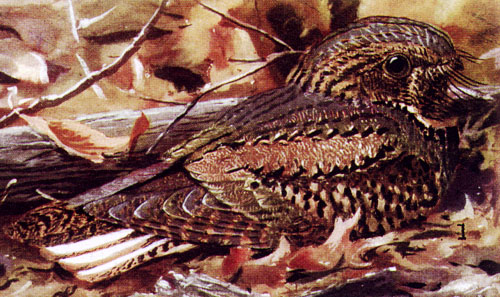
Chuck-will's-widow

Order: Caprimulgiformes Family: Caprimulgidae

Nightjars are medium-sized nocturnal birds that usually nest on the ground. They have long wings, short legs, and very short bills. Most have small feet, of little use for walking, and long pointed wings. Their soft plumage is cryptically colored to resemble bark or leaves. Four species of nightjar have been recorded in Georgia.

- Lesser nighthawk, Chordeiles acutipennis (accidental)
- Common nighthawk, Chordeiles minor
- Chuck-will's-widow, Antrostomus carolinensis
- Eastern whip-poor-will, Antrostomus vociferus

== Swifts ==
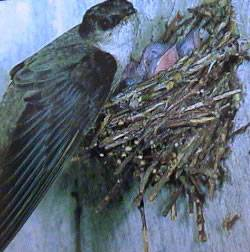
Chimney swift

Order: Apodiformes Family: Apodidae

The swifts are small birds, spending most of their lives flying. They have very short legs and never settle voluntarily on the ground, perching instead only on vertical surfaces. Many swifts have very long swept-back wings which resemble a crescent or boomerang. One species of swift has been recorded in Georgia.

- Chimney swift, Chaetura pelagica

== Hummingbirds ==
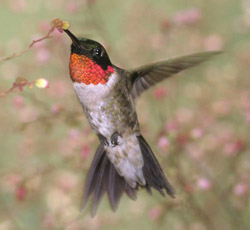
Ruby-throated hummingbird

Order: Apodiformes Family: Trochilidae

Hummingbirds are small birds capable of hovering in mid-air due to the rapid flapping of their wings. They are the only birds that can fly backwards. Thirteen species of hummingbird have been recorded in Georgia.

- Mexican violetear, Colibri thalassinus (P)
- Green-breasted mango, Anthracothorax prevostii (R)
- Rivoli's hummingbird, Eugenes fulgens (R)
- Blue-throated mountain-gem, Lampornis clemenciae (R)
- Ruby-throated hummingbird, Archilochus colubris
- Black-chinned hummingbird, Archilochus alexandri
- Anna's hummingbird, Calypte anna (R)
- Calliope hummingbird, Selasphorus calliope (R)
- Rufous hummingbird, Selasphorus rufus
- Allen's hummingbird, Selasphorus sasin (R)
- Broad-tailed hummingbird, Selasphorus platycercus (R)
- Broad-billed hummingbird, Cynanthus latirostris (R)
- Buff-bellied hummingbird, Amazila yucatanensis (R)

== Rails, gallinules, and coots ==
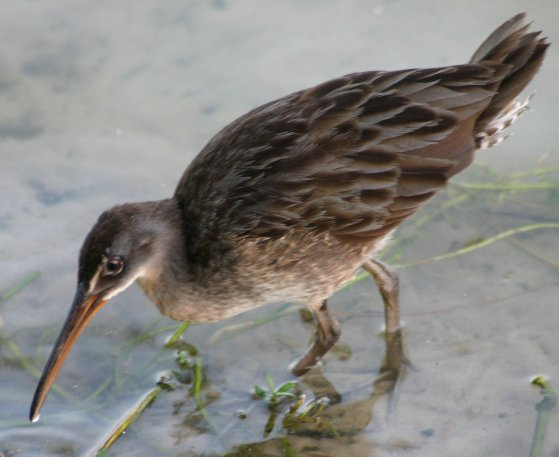
Clapper rail

Order: Gruiformes Family: Rallidae

The Rallidae is a large family of small to medium-sized birds which includes the rails, crakes, coots, and gallinules. The most typical family members occupy dense vegetation in damp environments near lakes, swamps, or rivers. In general they are shy and secretive, making them difficult to observe. Nine species of rails have been recorded in Georgia.

- Clapper rail, Rallus crepitans
- King rail, Rallus elegans
- Virginia rail, Rallus limicola
- Sora, Porzana carolina
- Common gallinule, Gallinula galeata
- American coot, Fulica americana
- Purple gallinule, Porphyrio martinicus
- Yellow rail, Coturnicops noveboracensis (R)
- Black rail, Laterallus jamaicensis (R)

== Limpkin ==
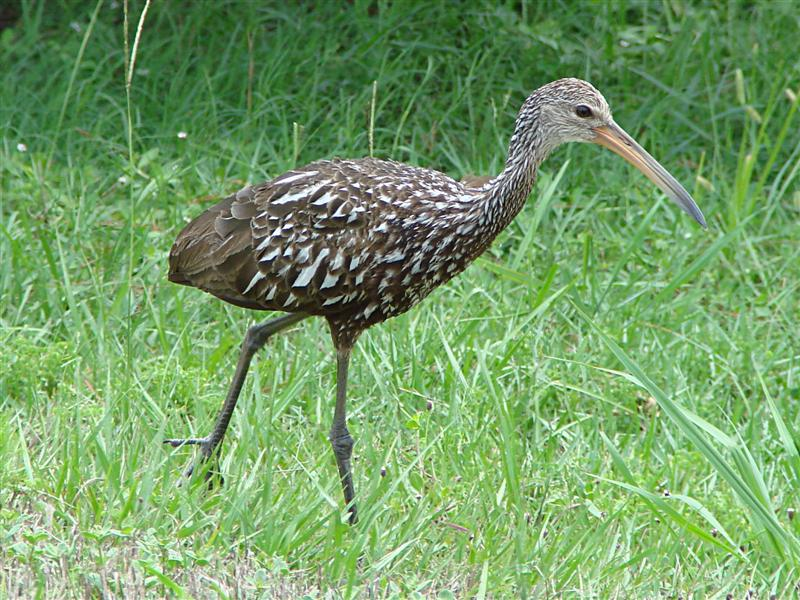
Limpkin

Order: Gruiformes Family: Aramidae

The limpkin is an odd bird that looks like a large rail, but is skeletally closer to the cranes. It is found in marshes with some trees or scrub in the Caribbean, South America and southern Florida. The family is monotypic, and its sole member has been recorded in Georgia.

- Limpkin, Aramus guarauna

== Cranes ==
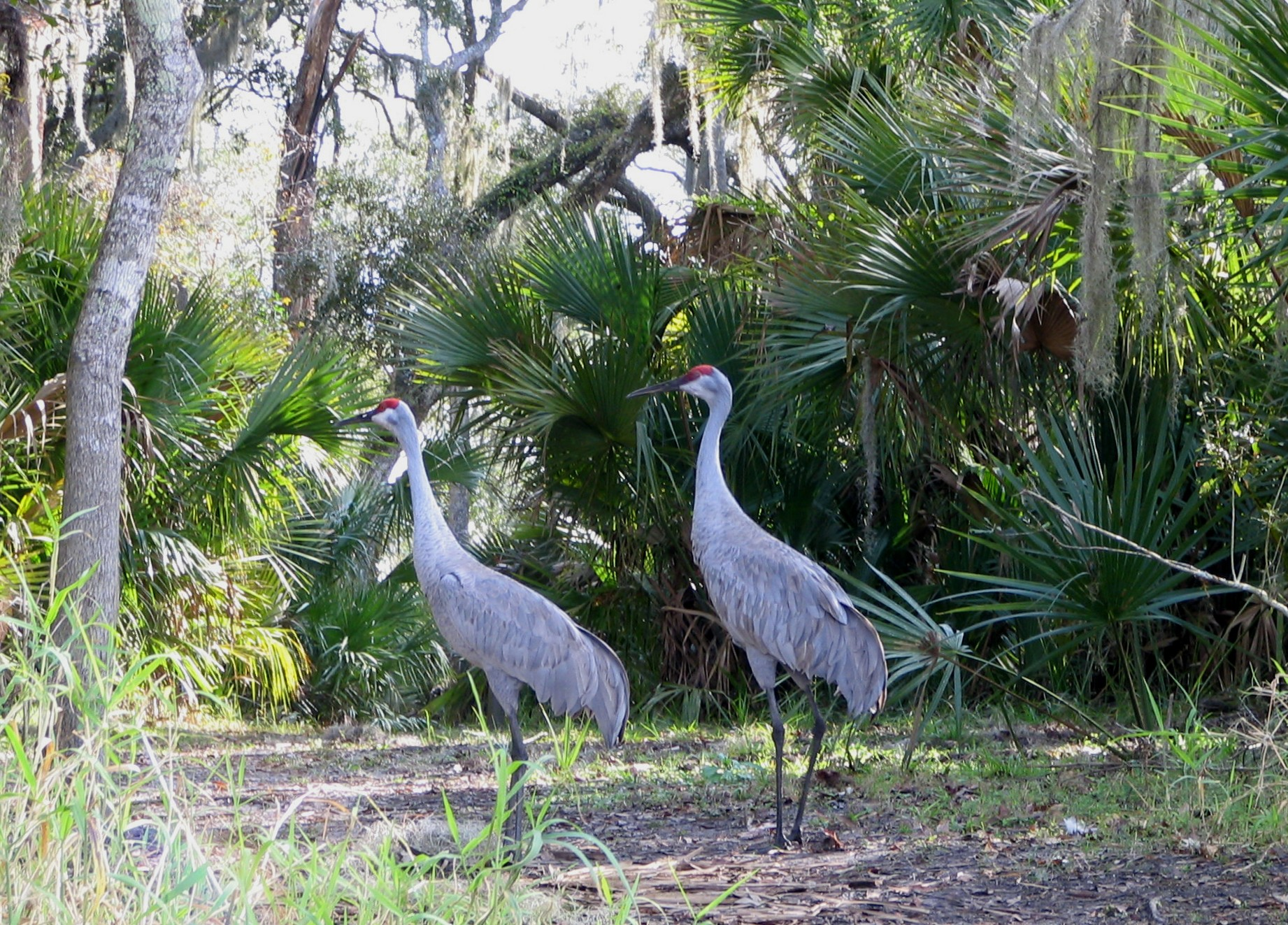
Sandhill cranes

Order: Gruiformes Family: Gruidae

Cranes are large, long-legged, and long-necked birds. Unlike the similar-looking but unrelated herons, cranes fly with necks extended. Most have elaborate and noisy courtship displays or "dances". Two species of crane have been recorded in Georgia.

- Sandhill crane, Antigone canadensis
- Whooping crane, Grus americana (R)

== Stilts and avocets ==
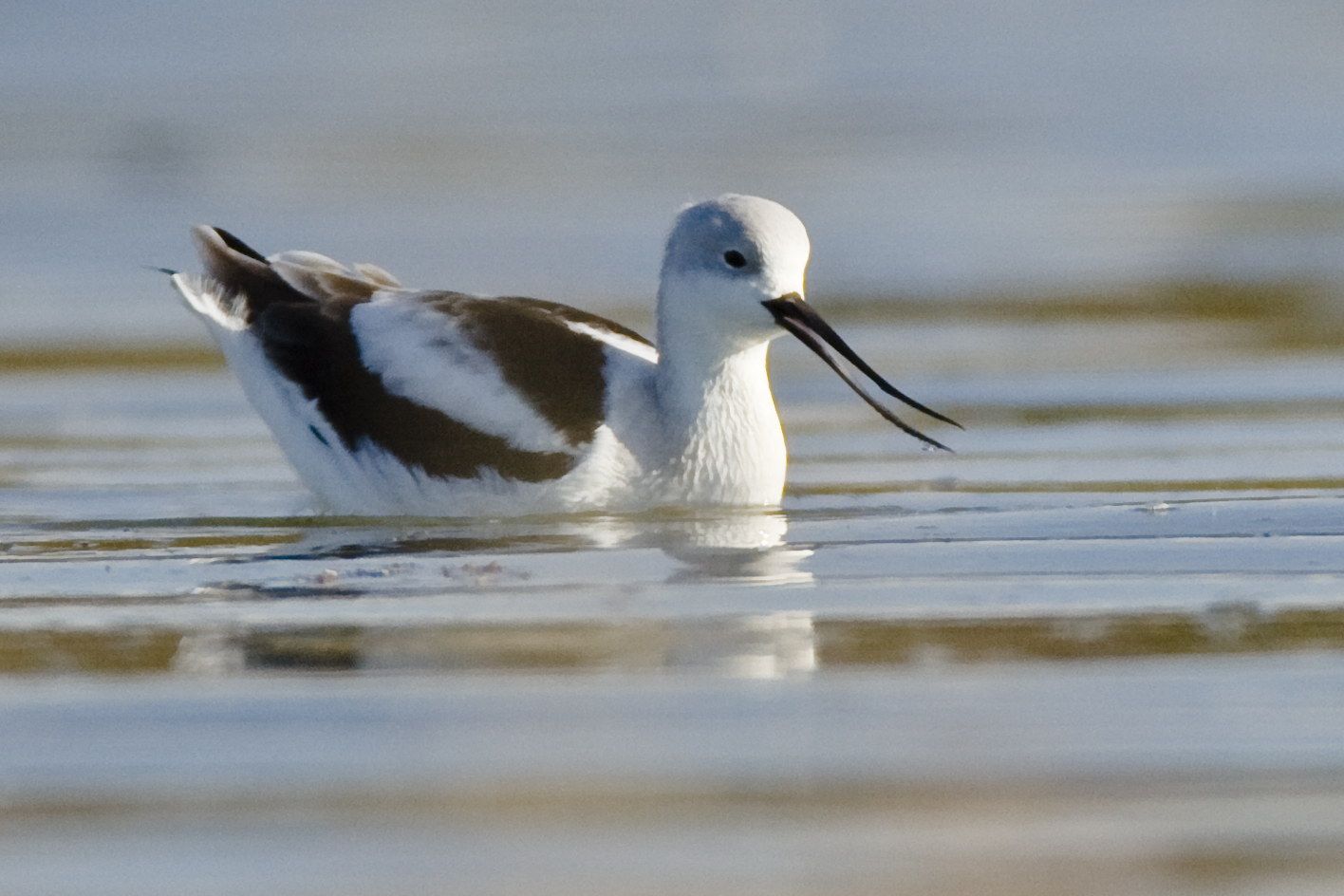
American avocet

Order: Charadriiformes Family: Recurvirostridae

Recurvirostridae is a family of large wading birds which includes the avocets and stilts. The avocets have long legs and long up-curved bills. The stilts have extremely long legs and long, thin, straight bills. Two species of this family have been recorded in Georgia.

- Black-necked stilt, Himantopus mexicanus
- American avocet, Recurvirostra americana

== Oystercatchers ==
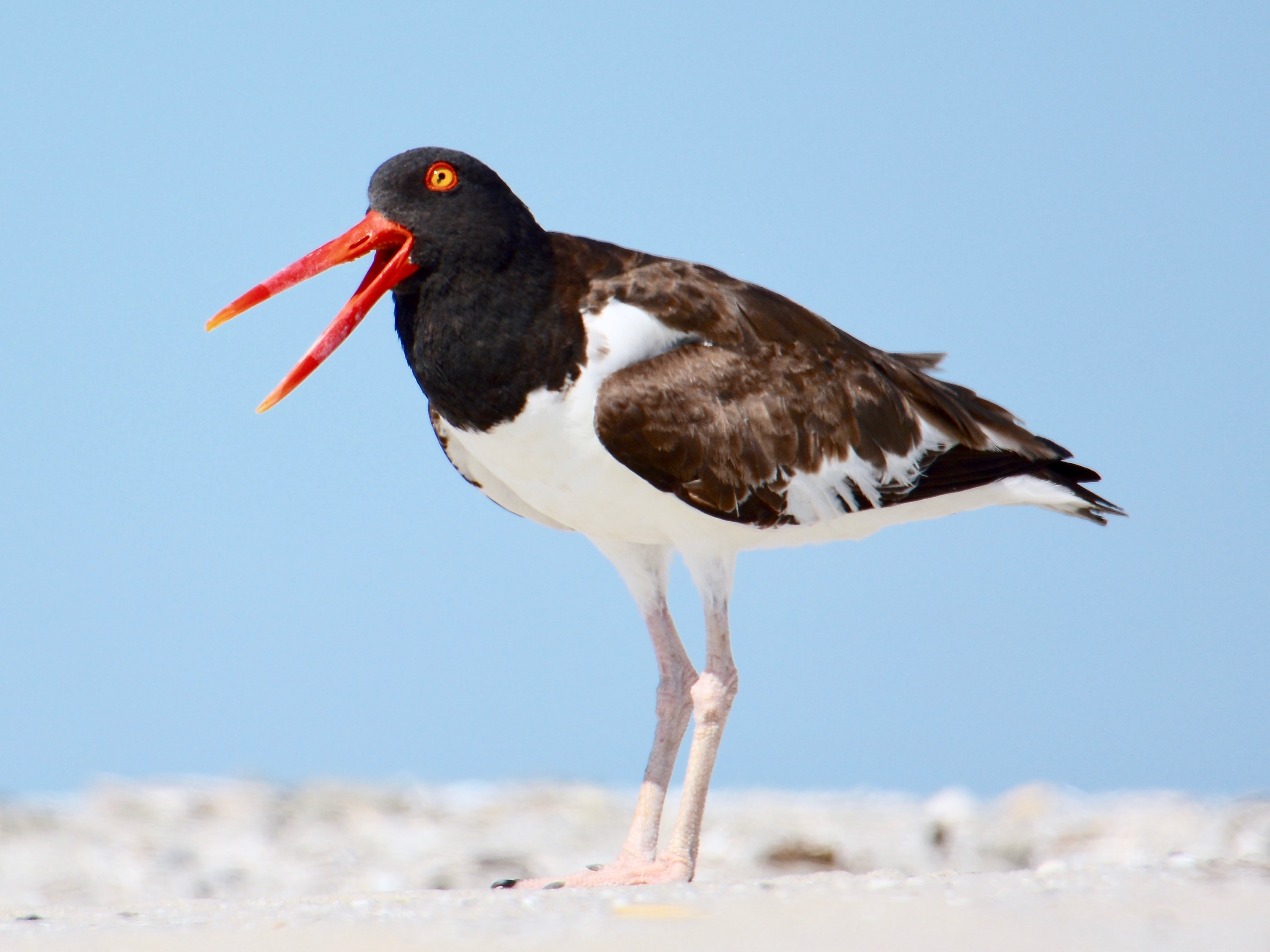
American oystercatcher

Order: Charadriiformes Family: Haematopodidae

The oystercatchers are large, conspicuous, and noisy plover-like birds, with strong bills used for smashing or prising open molluscs. A single species of oystercatcher has been recorded in Georgia.

- American oystercatcher, Haematopus palliatus

== Lapwings and plovers ==
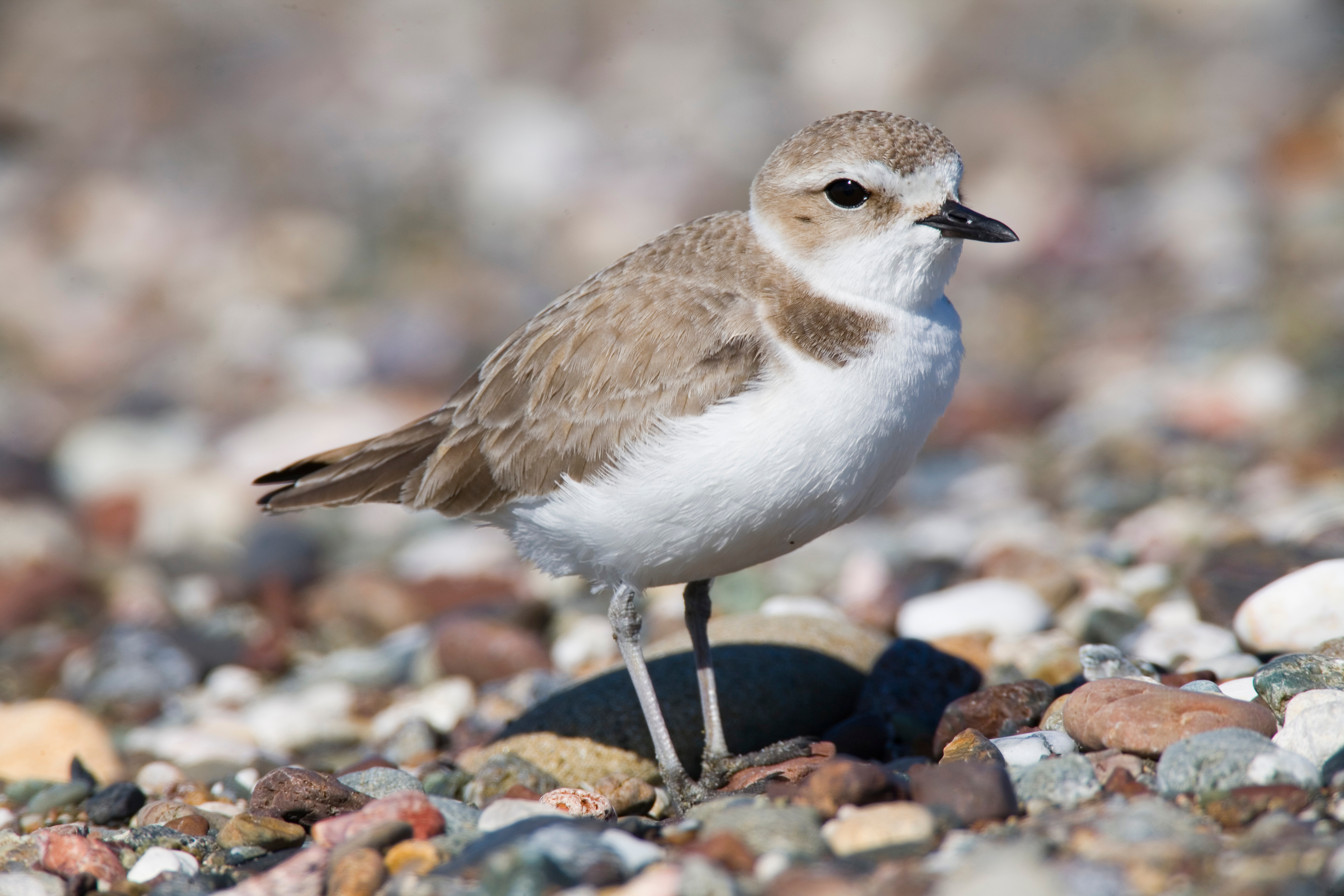
Snowy plover

Order: Charadriiformes Family: Charadriidae

The family Charadriidae includes the plovers, dotterels, and lapwings. They are small to medium-sized birds with compact bodies, short thick necks, and long, usually pointed, wings. They are generally found in open country, mostly in habitats near water. Eight species of Charadriidae have been definitively recorded in Georgia and another has been classed as provisional.

- Northern lapwing, Vanellus vanellus (R)
- Black-bellied plover, Pluvialis squatarola
- American golden-plover, Pluviali dominicas
- Killdeer, Charadrius vociferus
- Semipalmated plover, Charadrius semipalmatus
- Piping plover, Charadrius melodus
- Wilson's plover, Charadrius wilsonia
- Snowy plover, Charadrius nivosus (R)
- Mountain plover, Charadrius montanus (P)

== Sandpipers and allies ==
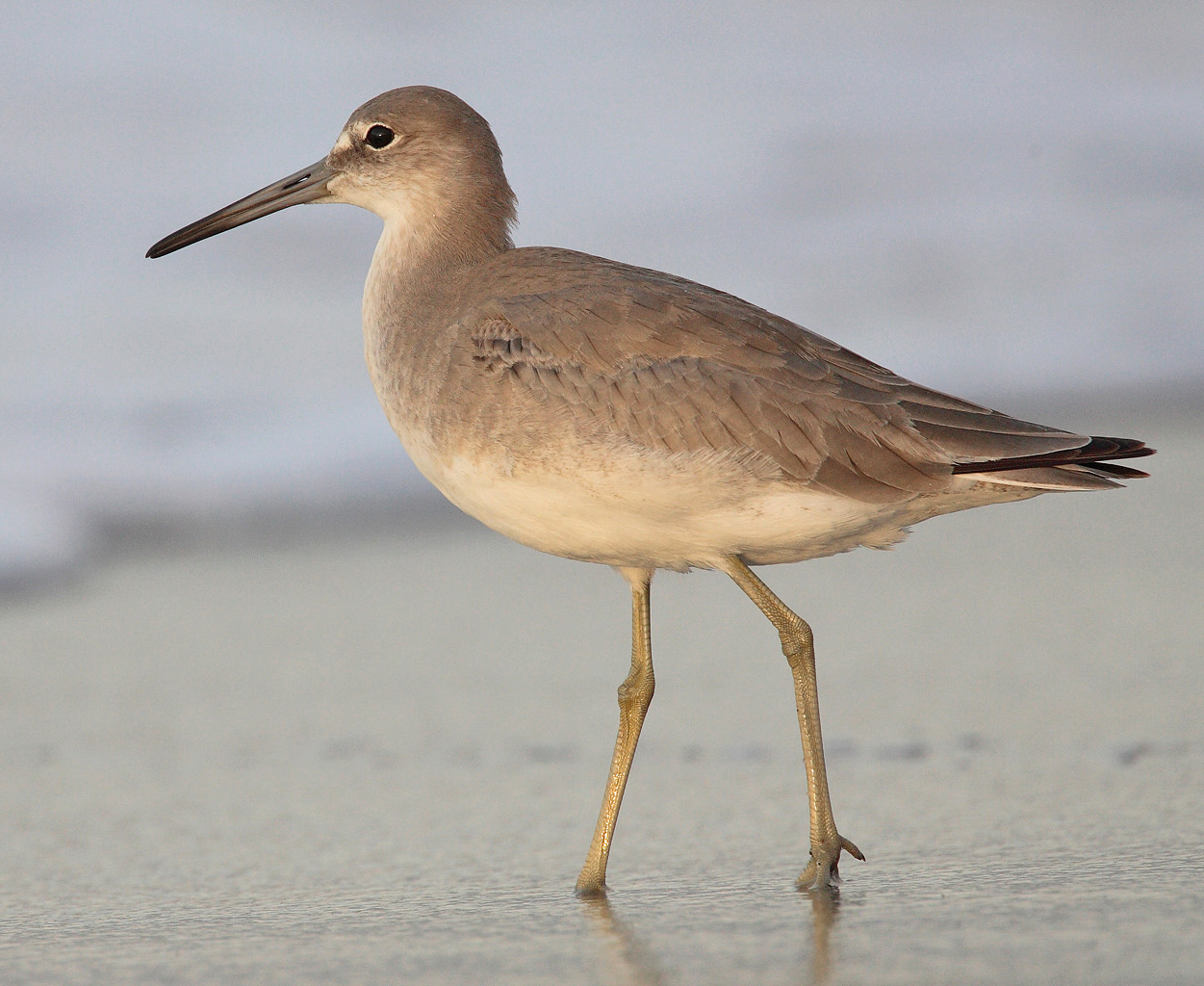
Willet

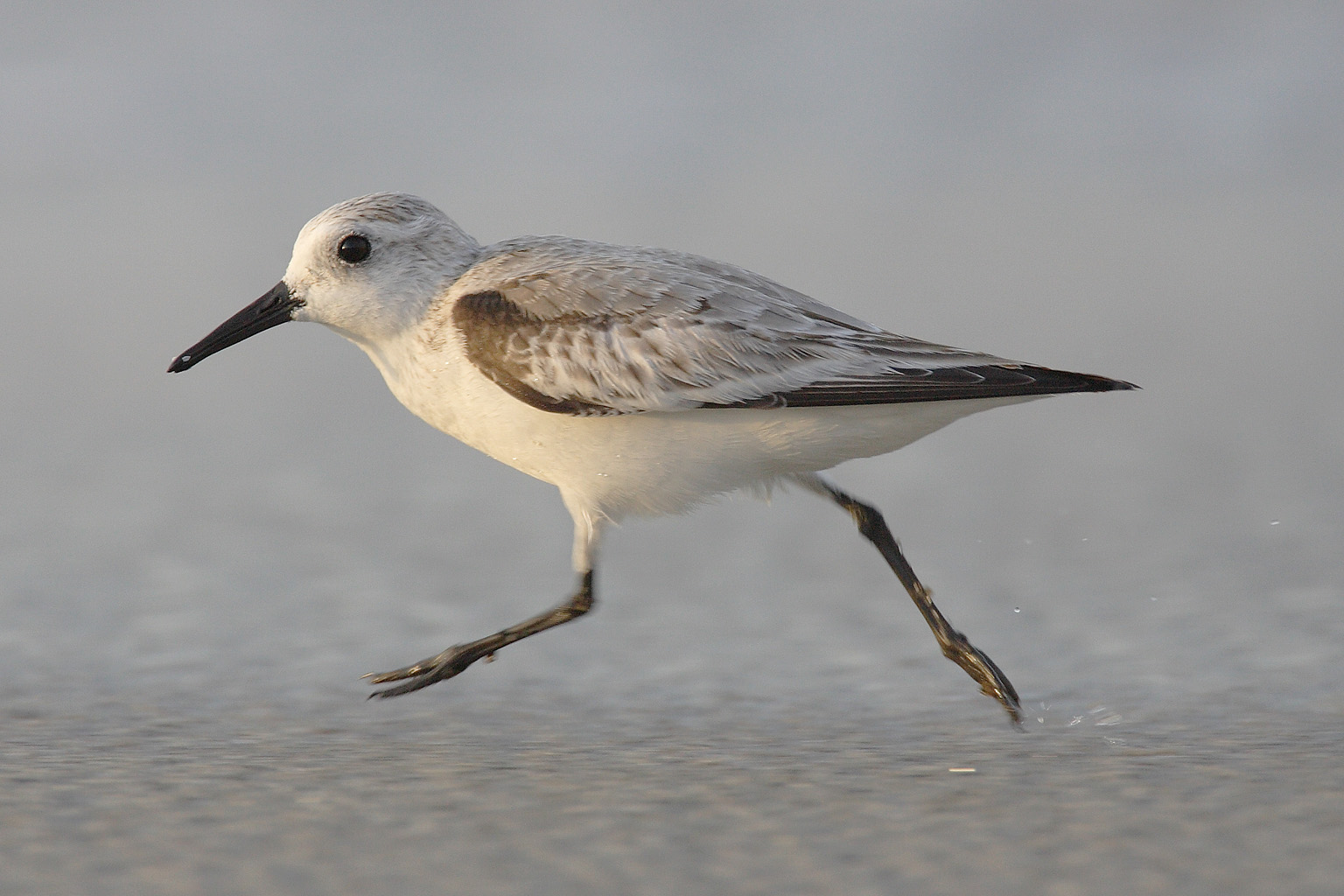
Sanderling

Order: Charadriiformes Family: Scolopacidae

Scolopacidae is a large and diverse family of small to medium-sized shorebirds. Most eat small invertebrates picked out of the mud or sand. Different lengths of legs and bills enable multiple species to feed in the same habitat, particularly on the coast, without direct competition for food. thirty-three species of scolopacidae have been recorded in Georgia.

- Upland sandpiper, Bartramia longicauda
- Whimbrel, Numenius phaeopus
- Long-billed curlew, Numenius americanus
- Bar-tailed godwit, Limosa lapponica (accidental)
- Hudsonian godwit, Limosa haemastica (R)
- Marbled godwit, Limosa fedoa
- Ruddy turnstone, Arenaria interpres
- Red knot, Calidris canutus
- Ruff, Calidris pugnax (R)
- Stilt sandpiper, Calidris himantopus
- Curlew sandpiper, Calidris ferruginea (R)
- Sanderling, Calidris alba
- Dunlin, Calidris alpina
- Purple sandpiper, Calidris maritima
- Baird's sandpiper, Calidris bairdii
- Least sandpiper, Calidris minutilla
- White-rumped sandpiper, Calidris fuscicollis
- Buff-breasted sandpiper, Calidris subruficollis
- Pectoral sandpiper, Calidris melanotos
- Semipalmated sandpiper, Calidris pusilla
- Western sandpiper, Calidris mauri
- Short-billed dowitcher, Limnodromus griseus
- Long-billed dowitcher, Limnodromus scolopaceus
- American woodcock, Scolopax minor
- Wilson's snipe, Gallinago delicata
- Spotted sandpiper, Actitis macularius
- Solitary sandpiper, Tringa solitaria
- Lesser yellowlegs, Tringa flavipes
- Willet, Tringa semipalmata
- Greater yellowlegs, Tringa melanoleuca
- Wilson's phalarope, Phalaropus tricolor
- Red-necked phalarope, Phalaropus lobatus
- Red phalarope, Phalaropus fulicarius

== Skuas and jaegers ==
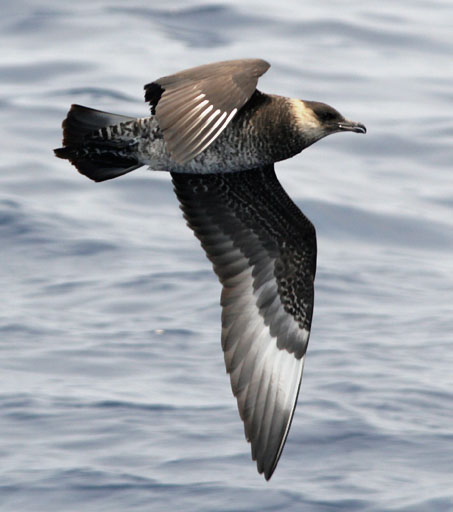
Pomarine jaeger

Order: Charadriiformes Family: Stercorariidae

Skuas and jaegers are medium to large seabirds, typically with gray or brown plumage, often with white markings on the wings. They have longish bills with hooked tips and webbed feet with sharp claws. They look like large dark gulls, but have a fleshy cere above the upper mandible. They are strong, acrobatic fliers. Four species of the family have been recorded in Georgia.

- South polar skua, Stercorarius maccormicki (R)
- Pomarine jaeger, Stercorarius pomarinus
- Parasitic jaeger, Stercorarius parasiticus
- Long-tailed jaeger, Stercorarius longicaudus (R)

== Auks, murres, and puffins ==
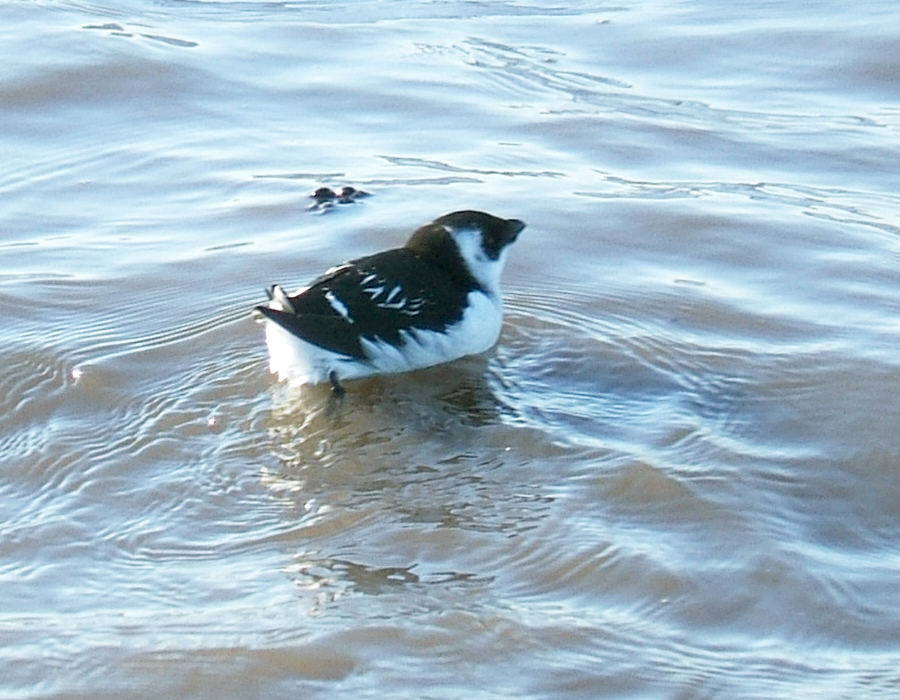
Dovekie

Order: Charadriiformes Family: Alcidae

Alcids (auks and their relatives) are superficially similar to penguins due to their black-and-white colors, their upright posture, and some of their habits; however they are not closely related to penguins and are (with one extinct exception) able to fly. Auks live on the open sea, only deliberately coming ashore to breed. Three species of auk have been recorded in Georgia.

- Dovekie, Alle alle (R)
- Razorbill, Alca torda
- Atlantic puffin, Fratercula arctica (accidental)

== Gulls, terns, and skimmers ==
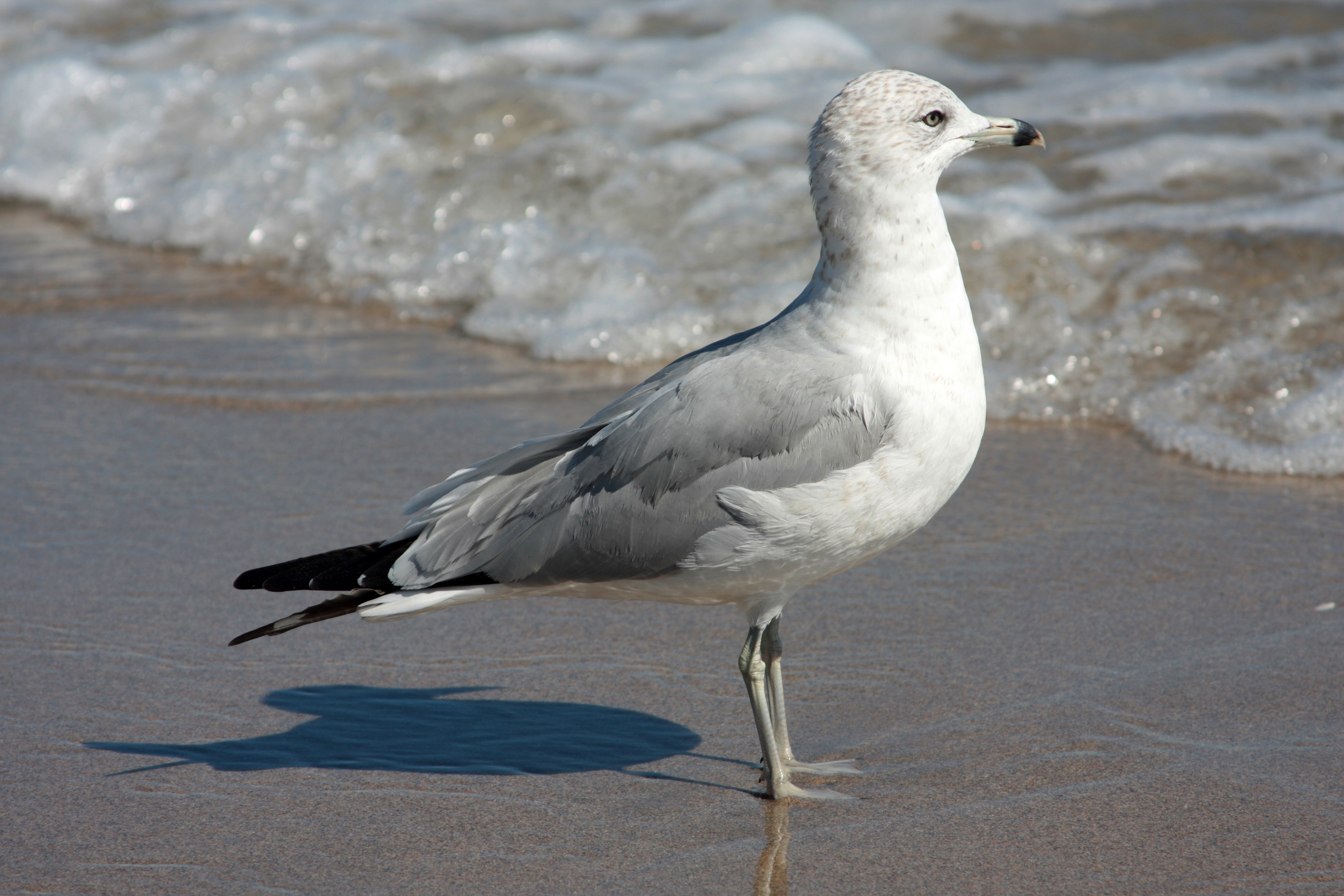
Ring-billed gull

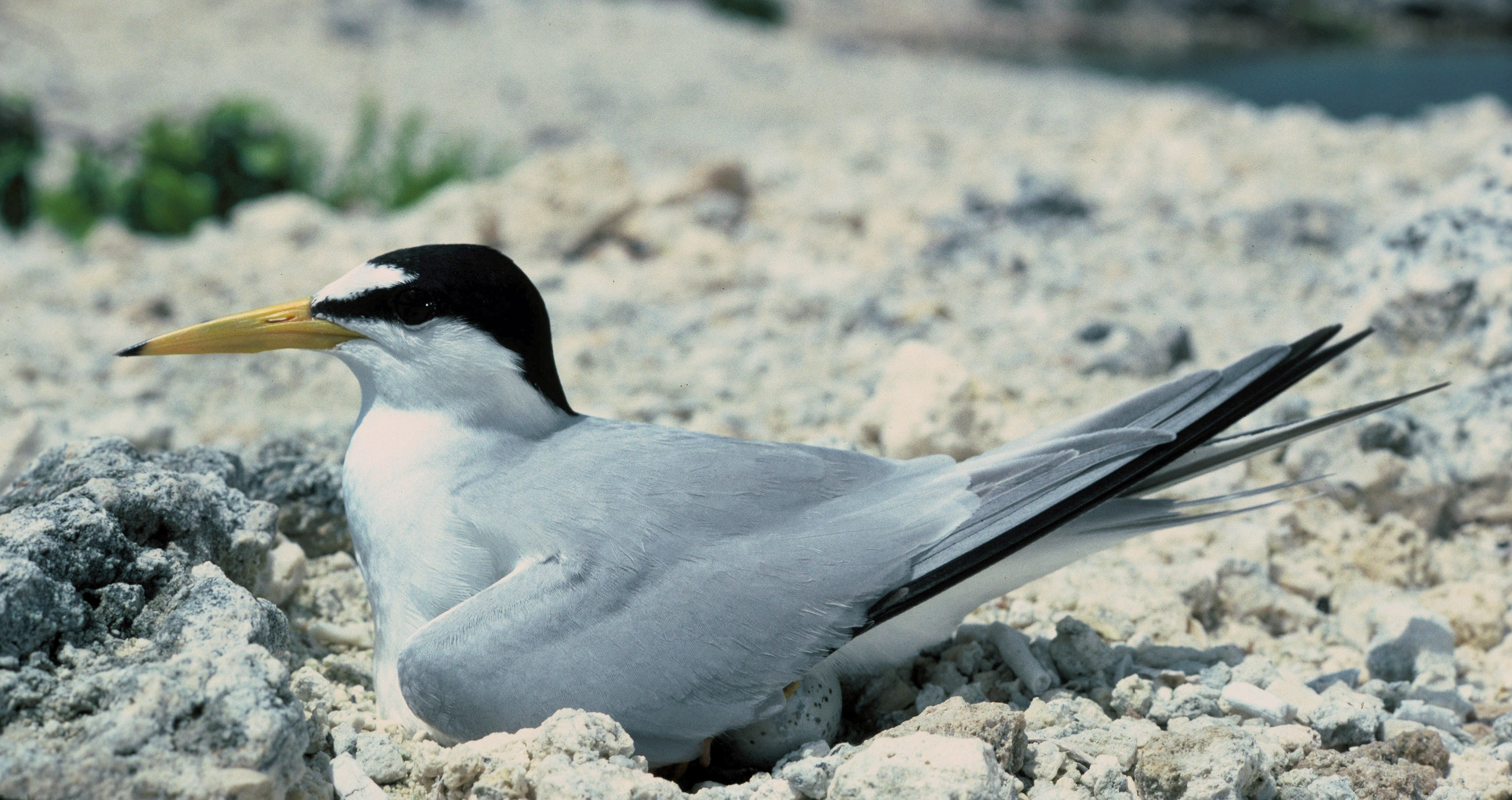
Least tern

Order: Charadriiformes Family: Laridae

The Laridae are a family of medium to large seabirds containing the gulls, terns, and skimmers. They are typically gray or white, often with black markings on the head or wings. They have stout, longish bills and webbed feet. Twenty-nine species of larids have been definitively recorded in Georgia and two more are classed as provisional.

- Black-legged kittiwake, Rissa tridactyla (R)
- Ivory gull, Pagophila eburnea (R)
- Sabine's gull, Xema sabini (R)
- Bonaparte's gull, Chroicocephalus philadelphia
- Black-headed gull, Chroicocephalus ridibundus (R)
- Little gull, Hydrocoleus minutus (R)
- Laughing gull, Leucophaeus atricilla
- Franklin's gull, Leucophaeus pipixcan
- Heermann's gull, Larus heermanni (accidental)
- Ring-billed gull, Larus delawarensis
- California gull, Larus californicus (R)
- Herring gull, Larus argentatus
- Iceland gull, Larus glaucoides (R)
- Lesser black-backed gull, Larus fuscus
- Glaucous gull, Larus hyperboreus
- Great black-backed gull, Larus marinus
- Brown noddy, Anous stolidus (R)
- Sooty tern, Onychoprion fuscata
- Bridled tern, Onychoprion anaethetus
- Least tern, Sternula antillarum
- Gull-billed tern, Gelochelidon nilotica
- Caspian tern, Hydroprogne caspia
- Black tern, Chlidonias niger
- White-winged tern, Chlidonias leucopterus (P)
- Roseate tern, Sterna dougallii (P)
- Common tern, Sterna hirundo
- Arctic tern, Sterna paradisaea (R)
- Forster's tern, Sterna forsteri
- Royal tern, Thalasseus maxima
- Sandwich tern, Thalasseus sandvicensis
- Black skimmer, Rynchops niger

== Tropicbirds ==
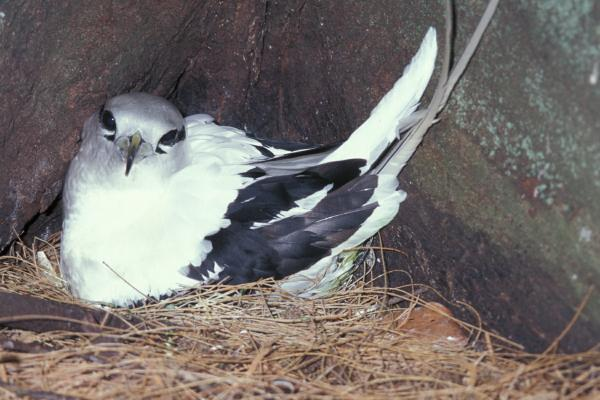
White-tailed tropicbird

Order: Phaethontiformes Family: Phaethontidae

Tropicbirds are slender white birds of tropical oceans with exceptionally long central tail feathers. Their long wings have black markings, as does the head. Two species of tropicbirds have been recorded in Georgia.

- White-tailed tropicbird, Phaethon lepturus (R)
- Red-billed tropicbird, Phaeton aethereus (R)

== Loons ==
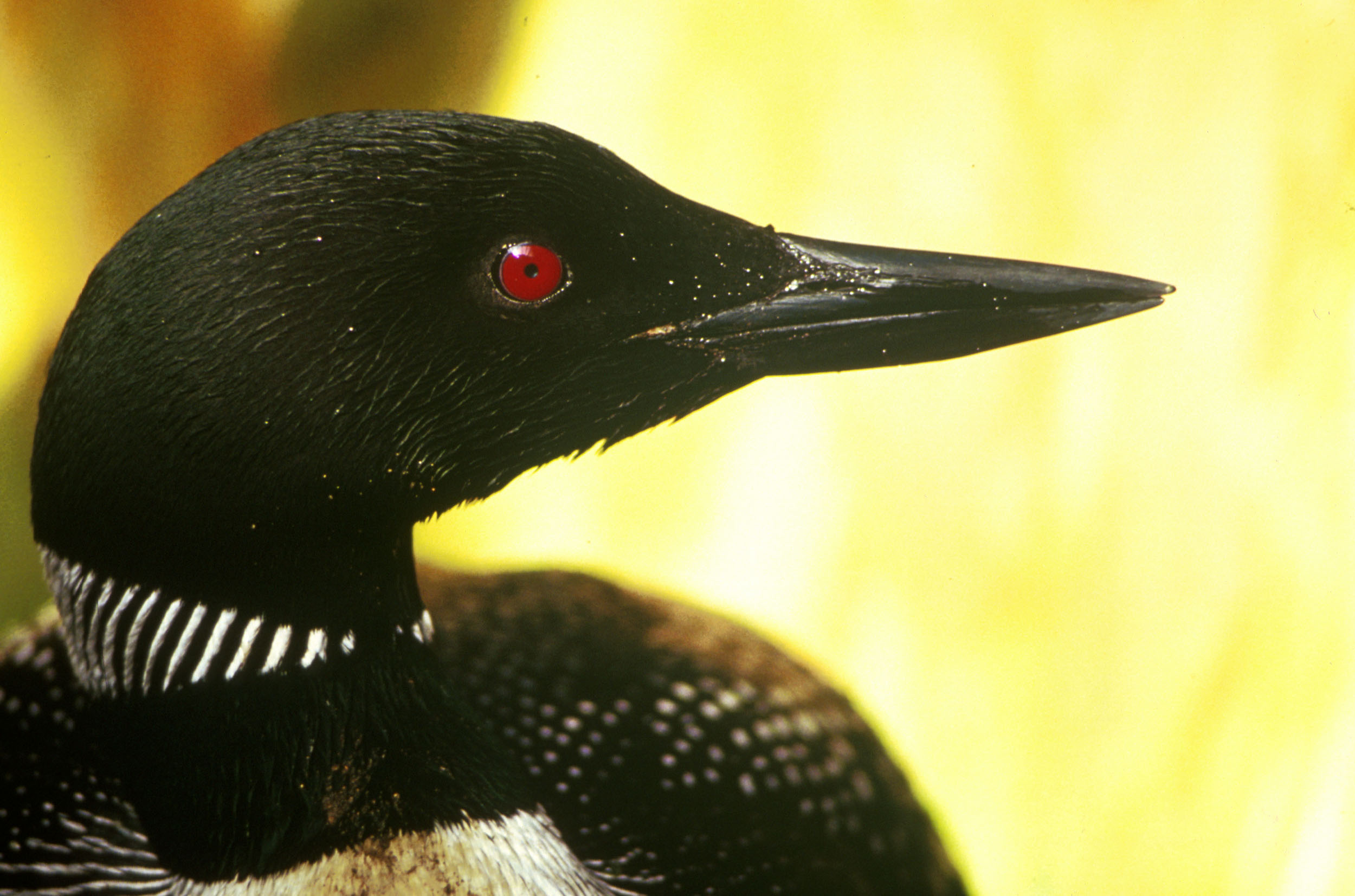
Common loon

Order: Gaviiformes Family: Gaviidae

Loons are aquatic birds the size of a large duck, to which they are unrelated. With mostly black plumage and spear-shaped bills, loons swim well and fly adequately, but because their legs are placed towards the rear of the body, are clumsy on land. Four species of loons have occurred in Georgia.

- Red-throated loon, Gavia stellata
- Pacific loon, Gavia pacifica (R)
- Common loon, Gavia immer
- Yellow-billed loon, Gavia adamsii (R)

== Southern storm-petrels ==
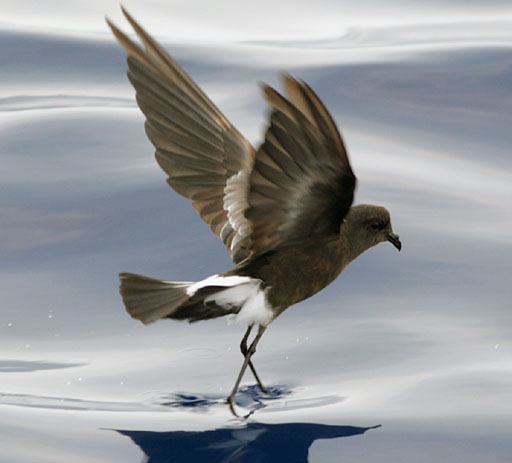
Wilson's storm-petrel

Order: Procellariiformes Family: Oceanitidae

The storm-petrels are the smallest seabirds, relatives of the petrels, feeding on planktonic crustaceans and small fish picked from the surface, typically while hovering. The flight is fluttering and sometimes bat-like. Until 2018, this family's three species were included with the other storm-petrels in family Hydrobatidae. One species of this family has been recorded in Georgia.

- Wilson's storm-petrel, Oceanites oceanicus

== Northern storm-petrels ==
Order: Procellariiformes Family: Hydrobatidae

Though the members of this family are similar in many respects to the southern storm-petrels, including their general appearance and habits, there are enough genetic differences to warrant their placement in a separate family. Two species of this storm-petrel family have been recorded in Georgia.

- Leach's storm-petrel, Hydrobates leucorhous (R)
- Band-rumped storm-petrel, Hydrobates castro (R)

== Shearwaters and petrels ==
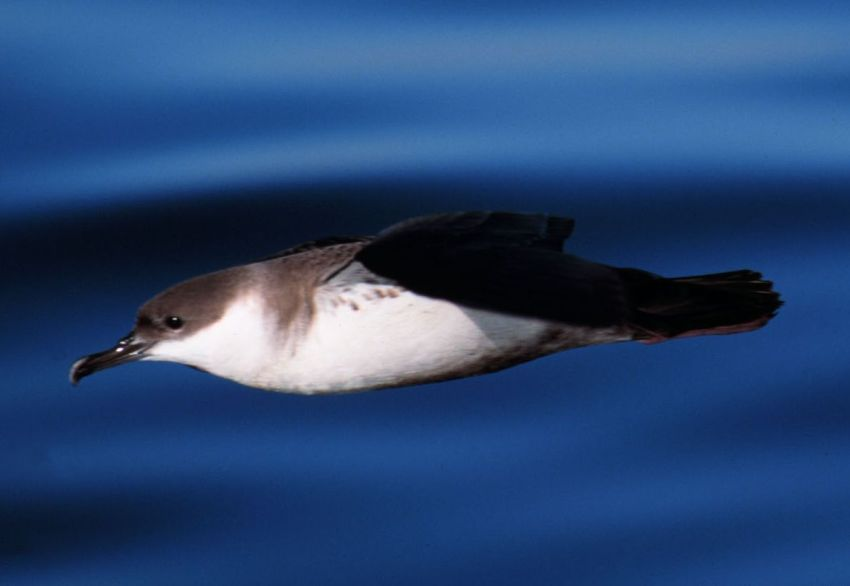
Great shearwater

Order: Procellariiformes Family: Procellariidae

The procellariids are the main group of medium-sized "true petrels", characterized by united tubular nostrils with a median septum. Six species of procellarids have been definitively recorded in Georgia and another has been classed as provisional.

- Northern fulmar, Fulmarus glacialis (P)
- Black-capped petrel, Pterodoma hasitata
- Cory's shearwater, Calonectris diomedea
- Sooty shearwater, Ardenna griseus (R)
- Great shearwater, Ardenna gravis
- Manx shearwater, Puffinus puffinus
- Sargasso shearwater, Puffinus lherminieri

== Storks ==
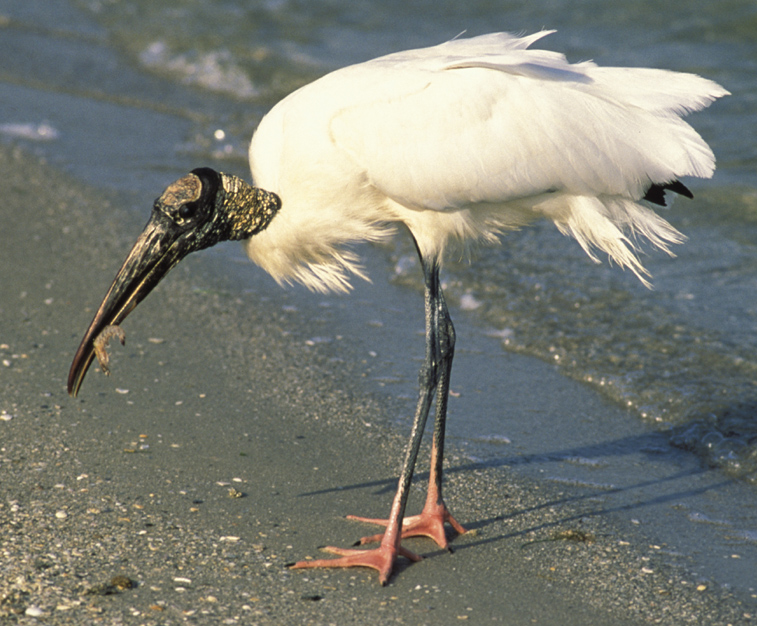
Wood stork

Order: Ciconiiformes Family: Ciconiidae

Storks are large, heavy, long-legged, long-necked wading birds with long stout bills and wide wingspans. They lack the powder down that other wading birds such as herons, spoonbills and ibises use to clean off fish slime. Storks lack a syrinx and are mute. A single species of stork has been recorded in Georgia.

- Wood stork, Mycteria americana

== Frigatebirds ==
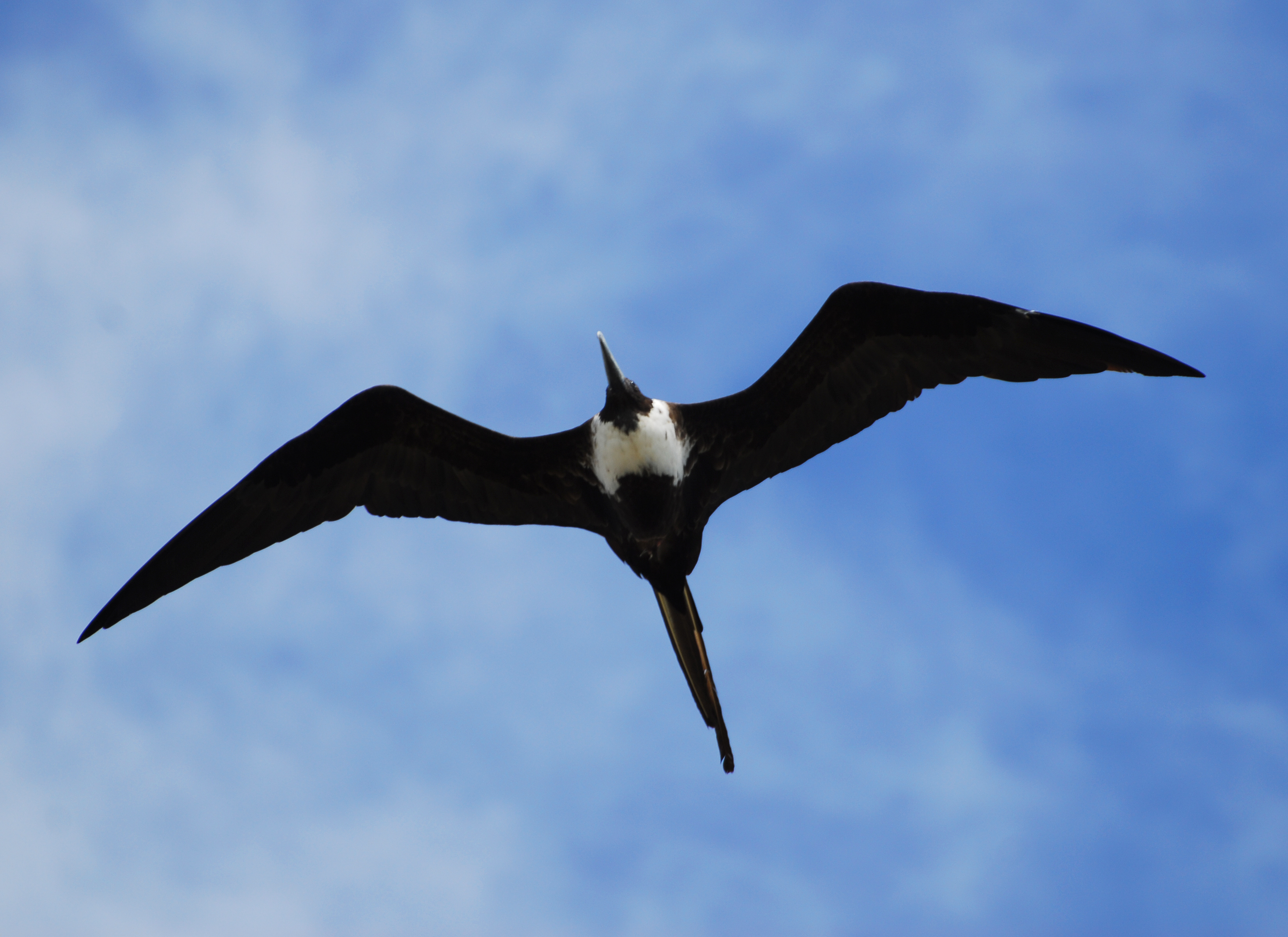
Magnificent frigatebird

Order: Suliformes Family: Fregatidae

Frigatebirds are large seabirds usually found over tropical oceans. They are large, black, or black and white, with long wings and deeply forked tails. The males have colored inflatable throat pouches. One species of frigatebird has been recorded in Georgia.

- Magnificent frigatebird, Fregata magnificens

== Boobies and gannets ==
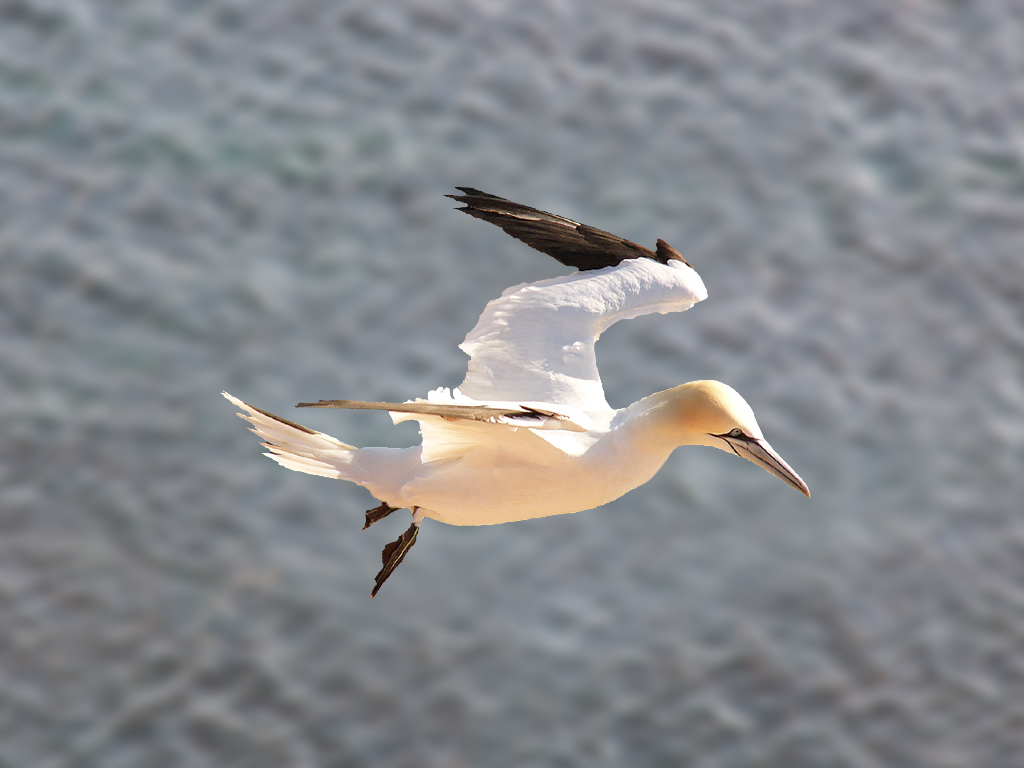
Northern gannet

Order: Suliformes Family: Sulidae

The sulids comprise the gannets and boobies. Both groups are medium-large coastal seabirds that plunge-dive for fish. Four species of sulid have been recorded in Georgia.

- Masked booby, Sula dactylatra (R)
- Brown booby, Sula leucogaster (R)
- Red-footed booby, Sula sula (R)
- Northern gannet, Morus bassanus

== Anhingas ==
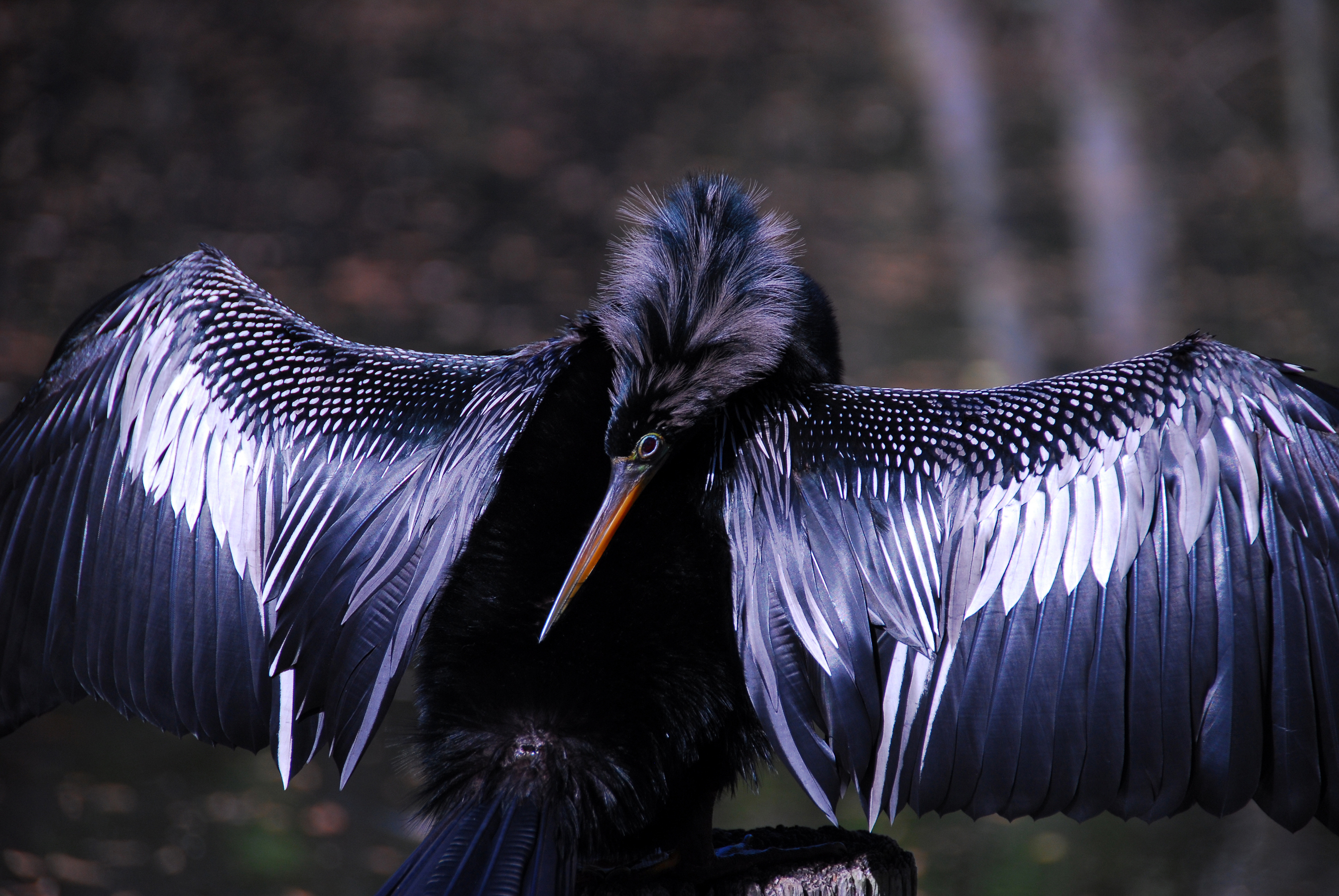
Anhinga

Order: Suliformes Family: Anhingidae

Anhingas are cormorant-like water birds with very long necks and long, straight beaks. They are fish eaters which often swim with only their neck above the water. One species of anhingidae has been recorded in Georgia.

- Anhinga, Anhinga anhinga

== Cormorants and shags ==
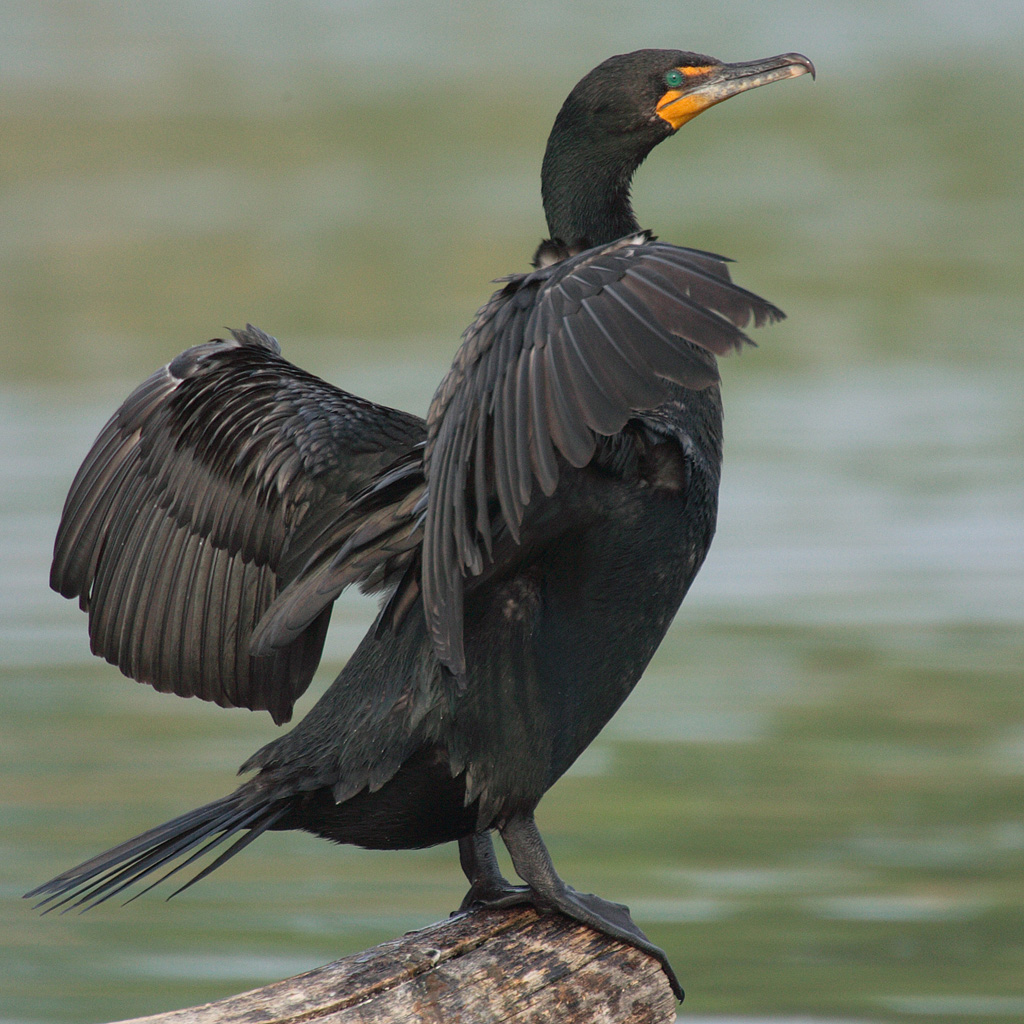
Double-crested cormorant

Order: Suliformes Family: Phalacrocoracidae

Cormorants are medium-to-large aquatic birds, usually with mainly dark plumage and areas of colored skin on the face. The bill is long, thin, and sharply hooked. Three species of cormorant have been recorded in Georgia.

- Great cormorant, Phalacrocorax carbo (R)
- Double-crested cormorant, Nannopterum auritum
- Neotropic cormorant, Nannopterum brasilianum (accidental)

== Pelicans ==
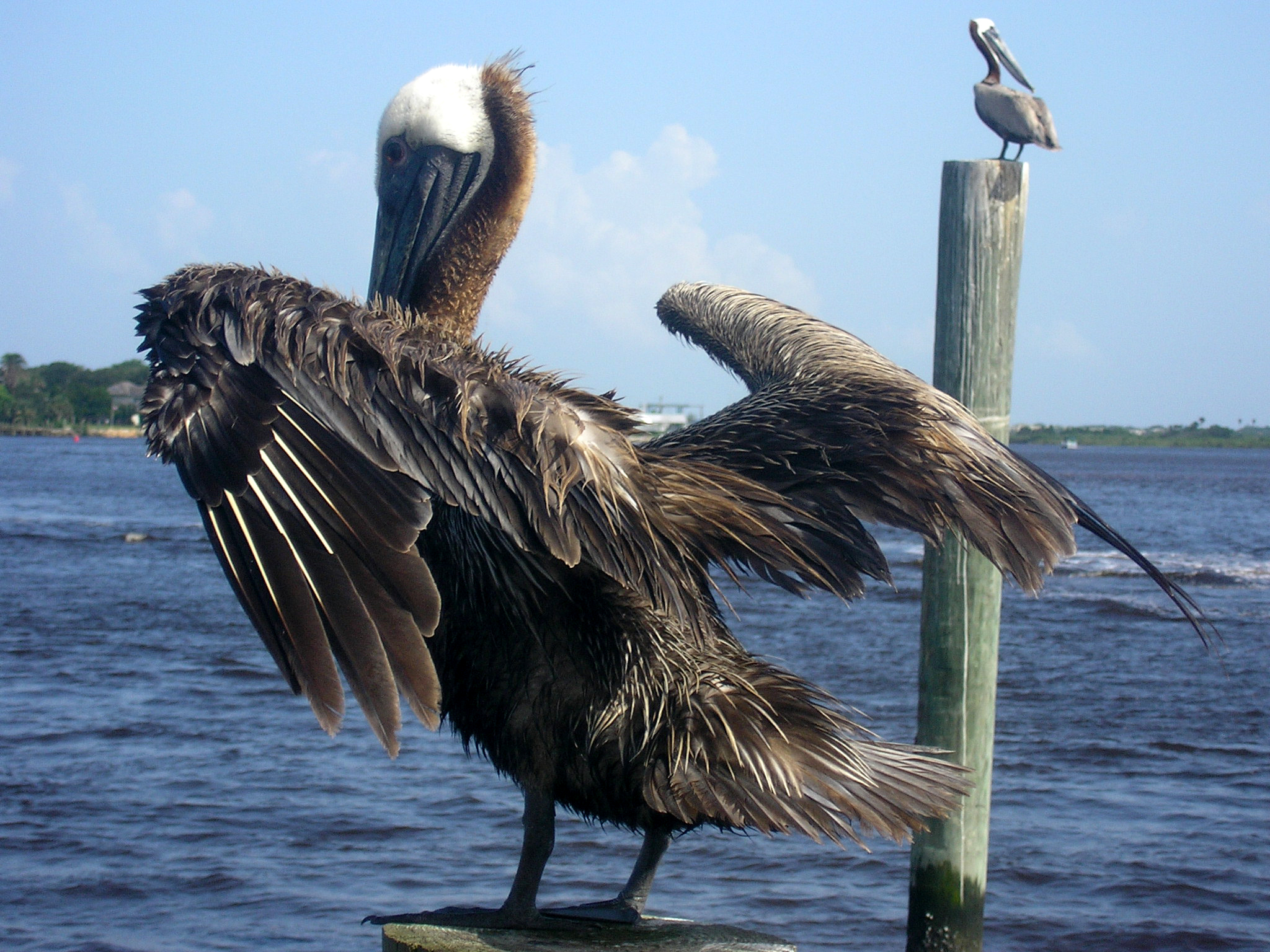
Brown pelicans

Order: Pelecaniformes Family: Pelecanidae

Pelicans are very large water birds with a distinctive pouch under their beak. Like other birds in the order Pelecaniformes, they have four webbed toes. Both species of pelican that occur in North America have been recorded in Georgia.

- American white pelican, Pelecanus erythrorhynchos
- Brown pelican, Pelecanus occidentalis

== Herons, egrets, and bitterns ==
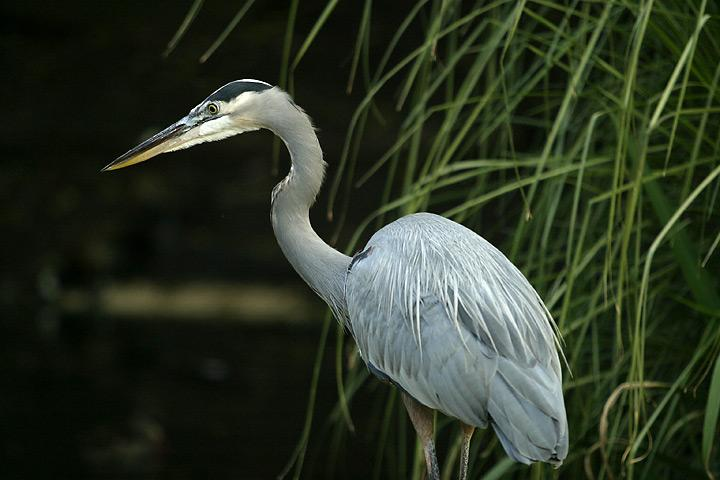
Great blue heron

Order: Pelecaniformes Family: Ardeidae

The family Ardeidae contains the herons, egrets, and bitterns. Herons and egrets are medium to large wading birds with long necks and legs. Bitterns tend to be shorter necked and more secretive. Twelve species of bitterns, herons, and egrets have been recorded in Georgia.

- American bittern, Botaurus lentiginosus
- Least bittern, Ixobrychus exilis
- Great blue heron, Ardea herodias
- Great egret, Ardea alba
- Snowy egret, Egretta thula
- Little blue heron, Egretta caerulea
- Tricolored heron, Egretta tricolor
- Reddish egret, Egretta rufescens
- Cattle egret, Bubulcus ibis
- Green heron, Butorides virescens
- Black-crowned night-heron, Nycticorax nycticorax
- Yellow-crowned night-heron, Nyctanassa violacea

== Ibises and spoonbills ==
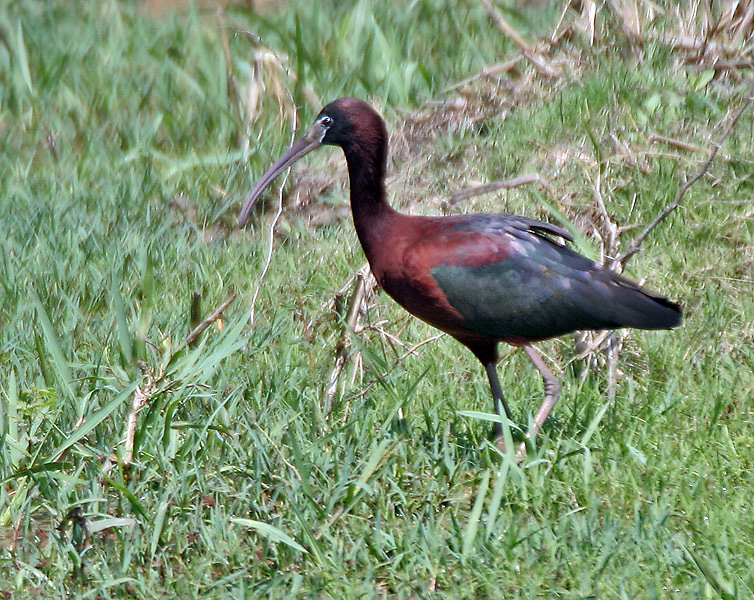
The glossy ibis can now be found throughout the world (with the exception of Antarctica)

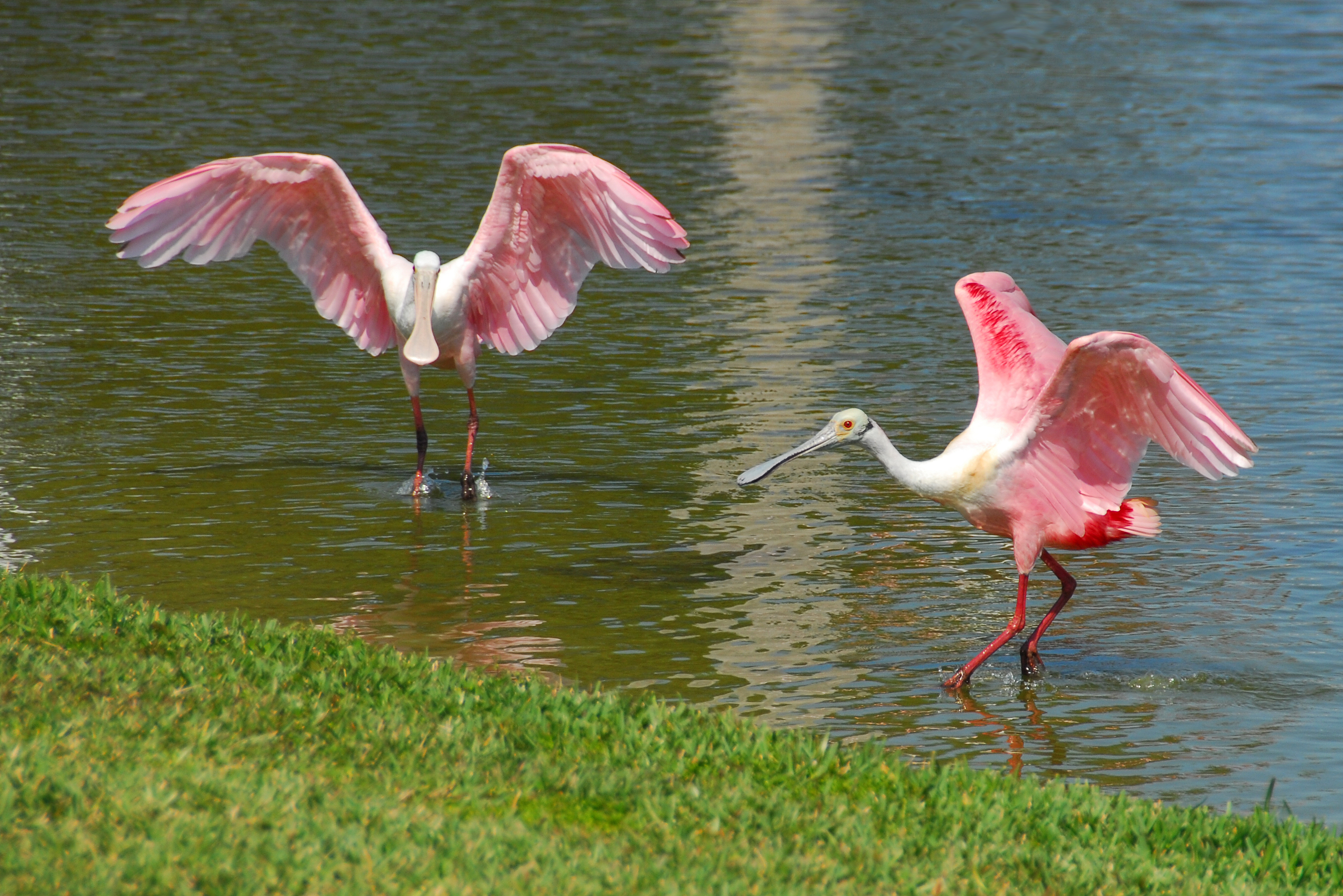
Roseate spoonbills

Order: Pelecaniformes Family: Threskiornithidae

The family Threskiornithidae includes the ibises and spoonbills. They have long, broad wings; the bill is also long, decurved in the case of the ibises, straight and distinctively flattened in the spoonbills. Three species of ibis and a single species of spoonbill have been recorded in Georgia.

- White ibis, Eudocimus albus
- Glossy ibis, Plegadis falcinellus
- White-faced ibis, Plegadis chihi (R)
- Roseate spoonbill, Platalea ajaja

== New World vultures ==
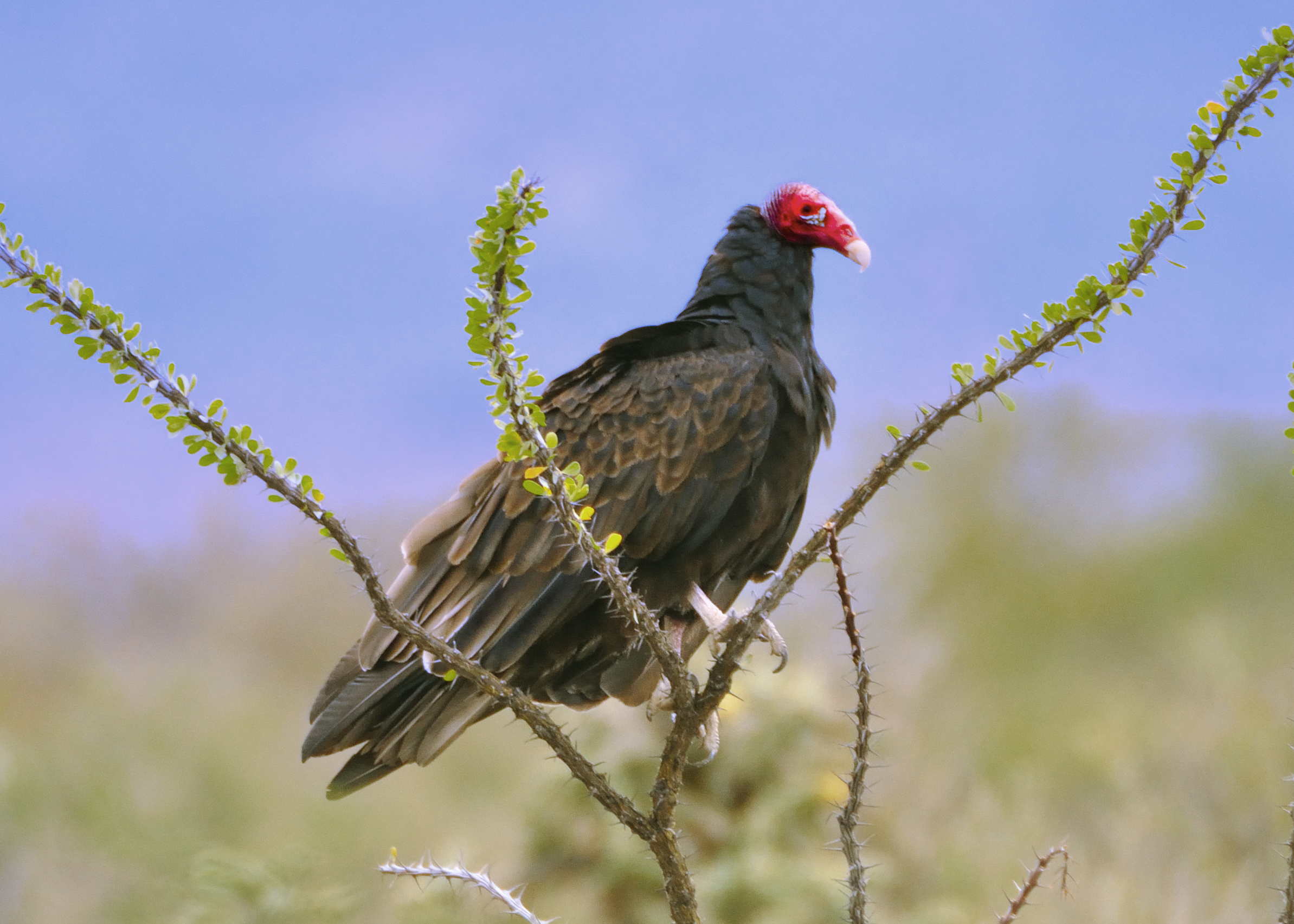
Turkey vulture

Order: Cathartiformes Family: Cathartidae

New World vultures are not closely related to Old World vultures, but superficially resemble them because of convergent evolution. Like the Old World vultures, they are scavengers; however, unlike Old World vultures, which find carcasses by sight, New World vultures have a good sense of smell with which they locate carcasses. Two species of New World vulture have been recorded in Georgia.

- Black vulture, Coragyps atratus
- Turkey vulture, Cathartes aura

== Osprey ==
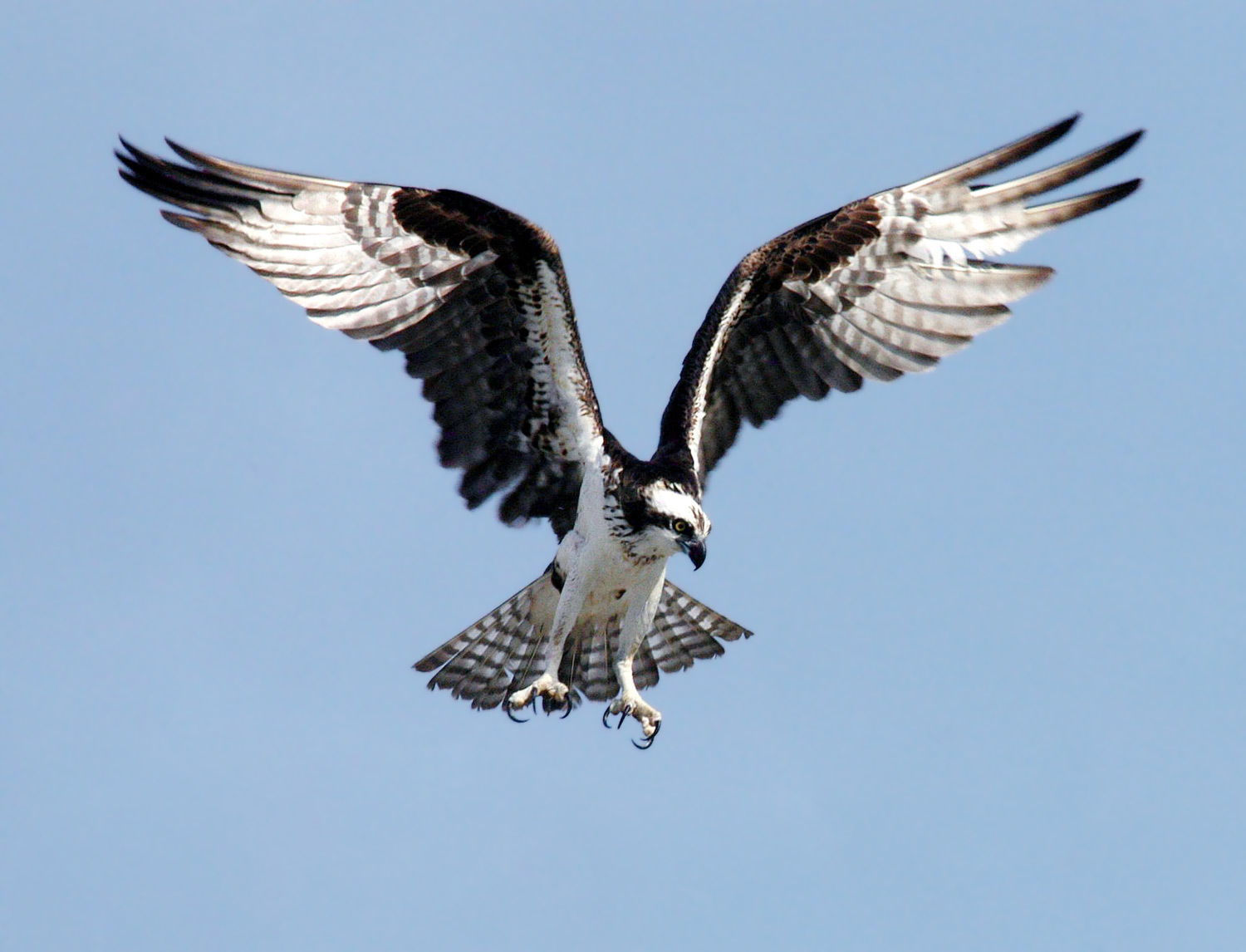
Osprey

Order: Accipitriformes Family: Pandionidae

Pandionidae is a family of fish-eating birds of prey, possessing a very large, powerful hooked beak for tearing flesh from their prey, strong legs, powerful talons, and keen eyesight. The family is monotypic; its sole member, the osprey, has been recorded in Georgia.

- Osprey, Pandion haliaetus

== Hawks, eagles, and kites ==
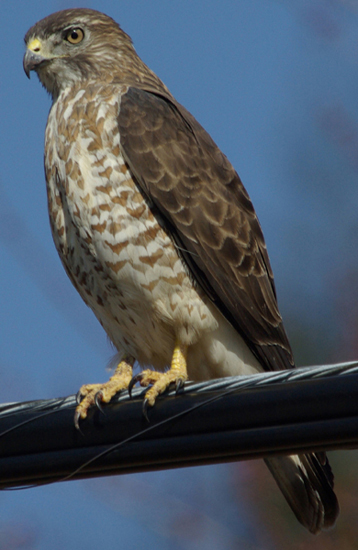
Broad-winged hawk

Order: Accipitriformes Family: Accipitridae

Accipitridae is a family of birds of prey that includes hawks, eagles, kites, harriers, and Old World vultures. They have very large, hooked beaks for tearing flesh from their prey, strong legs, powerful talons, and keen eyesight. Fourteen species of this family have been definitively recorded in Georgia and another has been classed as provisional.

- Swallow-tailed kite, Elanoides forficatus
- Hook-billed kite, Chondrohierax uncinatus (accidental)
- Golden eagle, Aquila chrysaetos
- Northern harrier, Circus hudsonius
- Sharp-shinned hawk, Accipiter striatus
- Cooper's hawk, Accipiter cooperii
- American goshawk, Accipiter atricapillus (R)
- Bald eagle, Haliaeetus leucocephalus
- Mississippi kite, Ictinia mississippiensis
- Red-shouldered hawk, Buteo lineatus
- Short-tailed hawk, Buteo brachyurus (R)
- Broad-winged hawk, Buteo platypterus
- Swainson's hawk, Buteo swainsoni (P)
- Red-tailed hawk, Buteo jamaicensis
- Rough-legged hawk, Buteo lagopus (R)

== Barn-owls ==
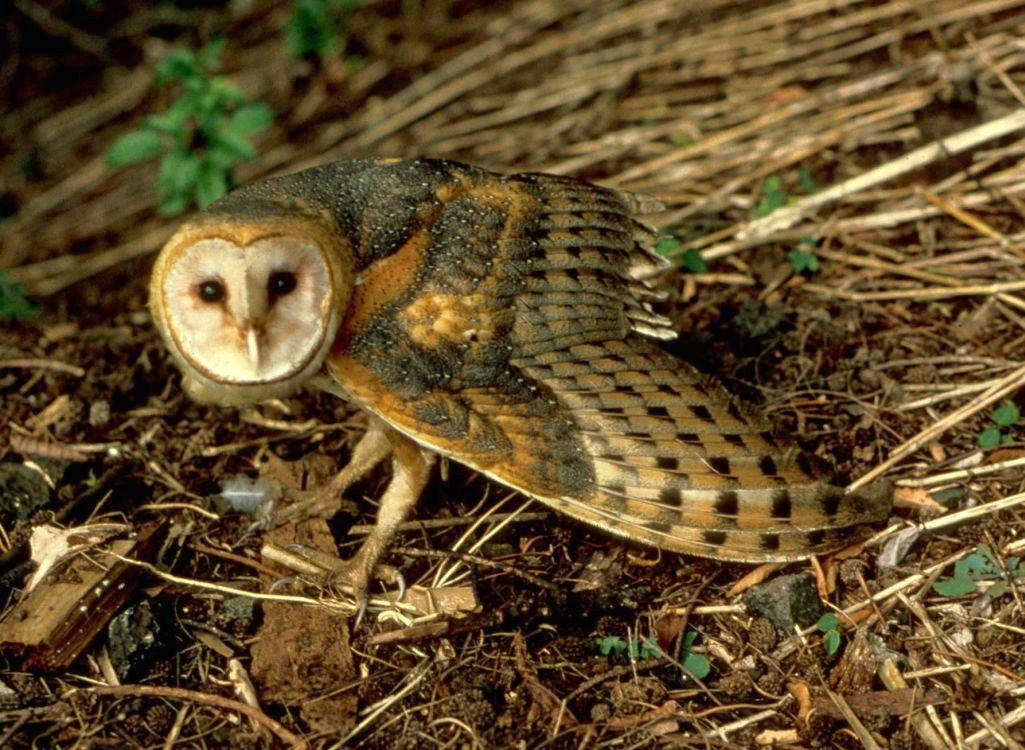
Barn owl

Order: Strigiformes Family: Tytonidae

Barn-owls are medium to large owls with large heads and characteristic heart-shaped faces. They have long strong legs with powerful talons. A single species of barn-owl has been recorded in Georgia.

- Barn owl, Tyto furcata

== Owls ==
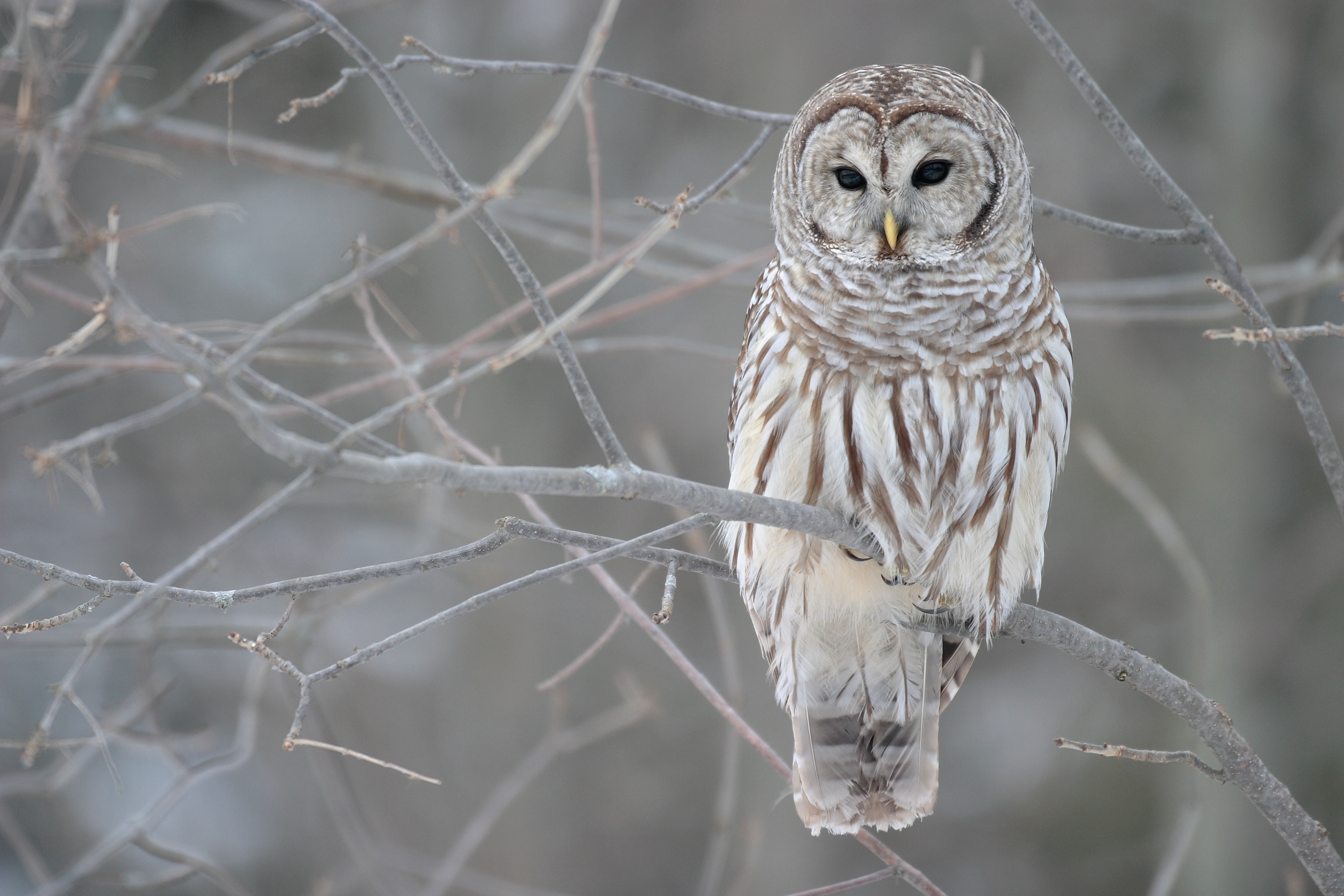
Barred owl

Order: Strigiformes Family: Strigidae

Typical owls are small to large solitary nocturnal birds of prey. They have large forward-facing eyes and ears, a hawk-like beak, and a conspicuous circle of feathers around each eye called a facial disk. Eight species of owl have been recorded in Georgia.

- Eastern screech-owl, Megascops asio
- Great horned owl, Bubo virginianus
- Snowy owl, Bubo scandiacus (R)
- Burrowing owl, Athene cunicularia (R)
- Barred owl, Strix varia
- Long-eared owl, Asio otus (R)
- Short-eared owl, Asio flammeus
- Northern saw-whet owl, Aegolius acadicus (R)

== Kingfishers ==
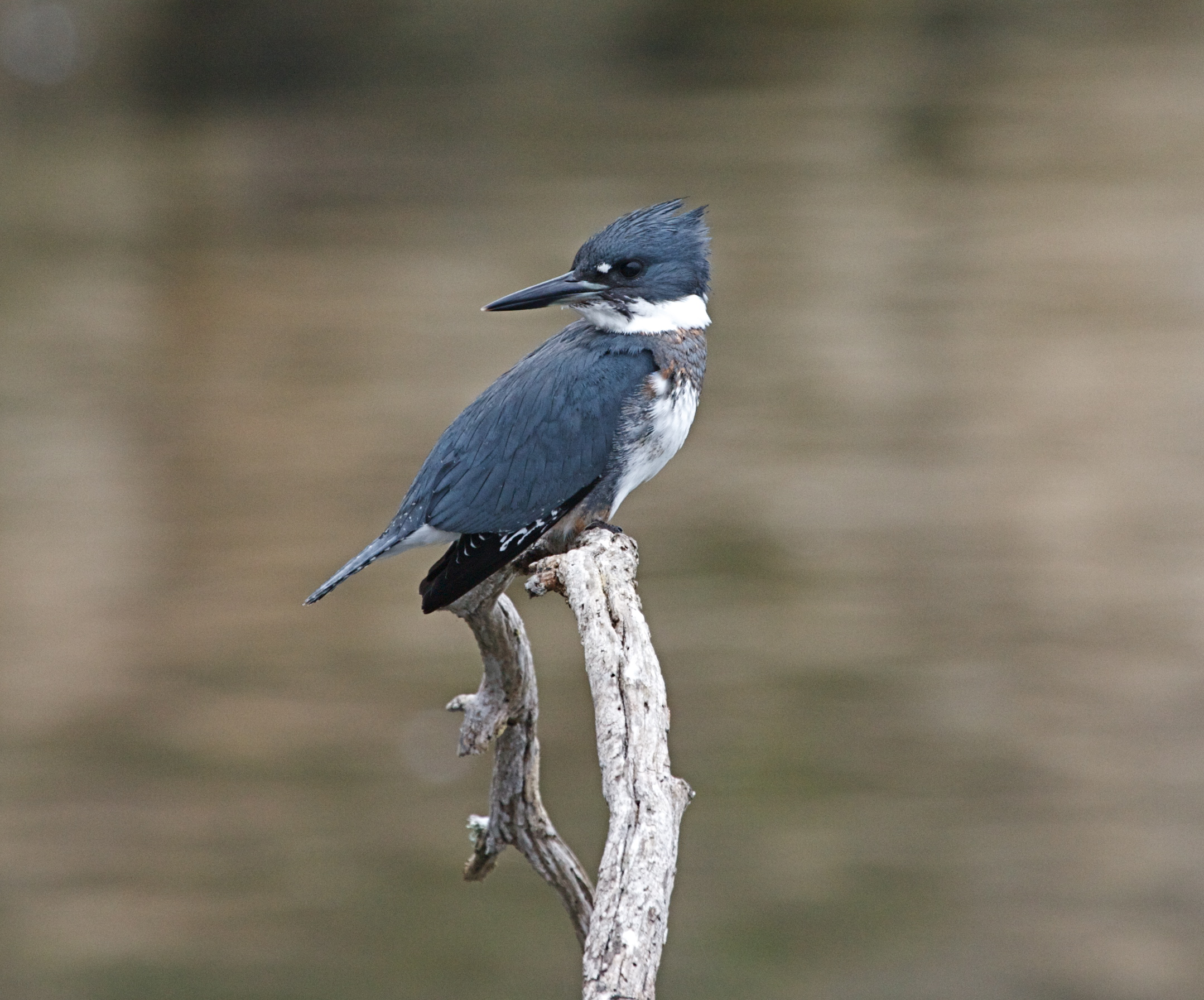
Belted kingfisher

Order: Coraciiformes Family: Alcedinidae

Kingfishers are medium-sized birds with large heads, long pointed bills, short legs, and stubby tails. Two species of kingfisher has been recorded in Georgia.

- Ringed kingfisher, Megaceryle torquata (accidental)
- Belted kingfisher, Megaceryle alcyon

== Woodpeckers ==
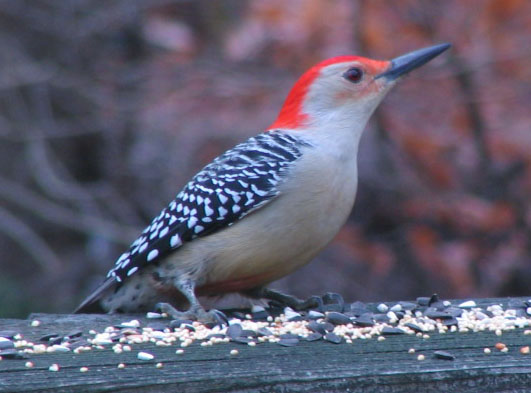
Red-bellied woodpecker

Order: Piciformes Family: Picidae

Woodpeckers are small to medium-sized birds with chisel-like beaks, short legs, stiff tails, and long tongues used for capturing insects. Some species have feet with two toes pointing forward and two backward, while several species have only three toes. Many woodpeckers have the habit of tapping noisily on tree trunks with their beaks. Nine species of woodpecker have been recorded in Georgia.

- Red-headed woodpecker, Melanerpes erythrocephalus
- Red-bellied woodpecker, Melanerpes carolinus
- Yellow-bellied sapsucker, Sphyrapicus varius
- Downy woodpecker, Dryobates pubescens
- Red-cockaded woodpecker, Dryobates borealis
- Hairy woodpecker, Dryobates villosus
- Northern flicker, Colaptes auratus
- Pileated woodpecker, Dryocopus pileatus
- Ivory-billed woodpecker, Campephilus principalis (R) (E?) (Note: Often considered extinct; see the species' article for the controversy surrounding it.)

== Falcons and caracaras ==
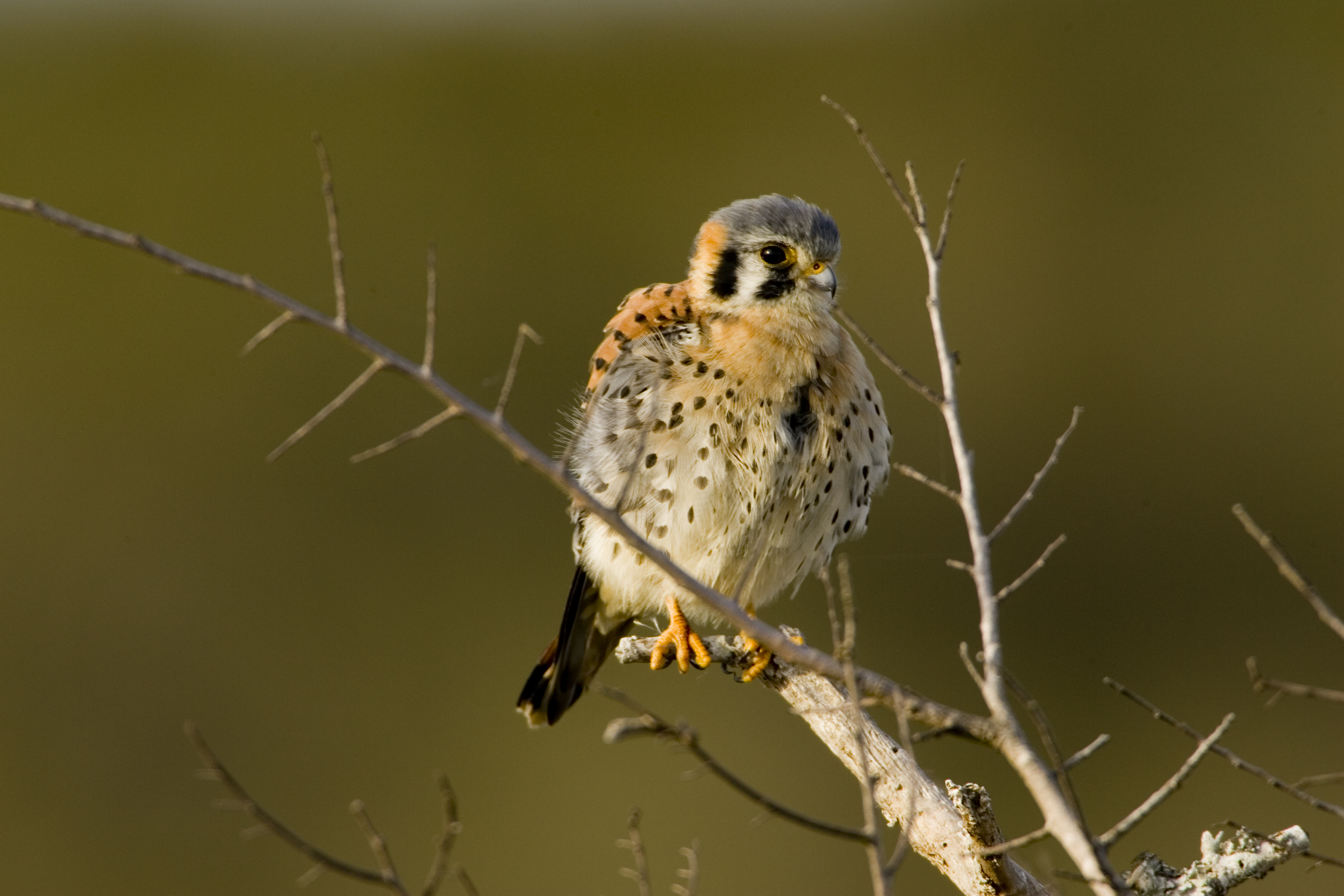
American kestrel

Order: Falconiformes Family: Falconidae

The Falconidae is a family of diurnal birds of prey containing the falcons and caracaras. They differ from hawks, eagles, and kites in that they kill with their beaks instead of their talons. Four species of falcon have been recorded in Georgia.

- Crested caracara, Caracara plancus (R)
- American kestrel, Falco sparverius
- Merlin, Falco columbarius
- Peregrine falcon, Falco peregrinus

== Tyrant flycatchers ==
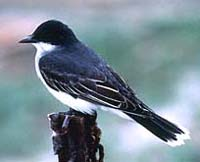
Eastern kingbird

Order: Passeriformes Family: Tyrannidae

Tyrant flycatchers are passerines which occur throughout North and South America. They superficially resemble the Old World flycatchers, but are more robust and have stronger bills. They do not have the sophisticated vocal capabilities of the songbirds. Most, but not all, are rather plain. As the name implies, most are insectivorous. Twenty-one species of tyrant flycatcher have been recorded in Georgia.

- Ash-throated flycatcher, Myiarchus cinerascens (R)
- Great crested flycatcher, Myiarchus crinitus
- Tropical kingbird, Tyrannus melancholicus (R)
- Couch's kingbird, Tyrannus couchii (accidental)
- Western kingbird, Tyrannus verticalis
- Eastern kingbird, Tyrannus tyrannus
- Gray kingbird, Tyrannus dominicensis
- Scissor-tailed flycatcher, Tyrannus forficatus
- Fork-tailed flycatcher, Tyrannus savana (accidental)
- Olive-sided flycatcher, Contopus cooperi
- Eastern wood-pewee, Contopus virens
- Yellow-bellied flycatcher, Empidonax flaviventris
- Acadian flycatcher, Empidonax virescens
- Alder flycatcher, Empidonax alnorum
- Willow flycatcher, Empidonax traillii
- Least flycatcher, Empidonax minimus
- Hammond's flycatcher, Empidonax hammondii (accidental)
- Dusky flycatcher, Empidonax oberholseri (R)
- Eastern phoebe, Sayornis phoebe
- Say's phoebe, Sayornis saya (R)

== Vireos, shrike-babblers, and erpornis ==
Order: Passeriformes Family: Vireonidae

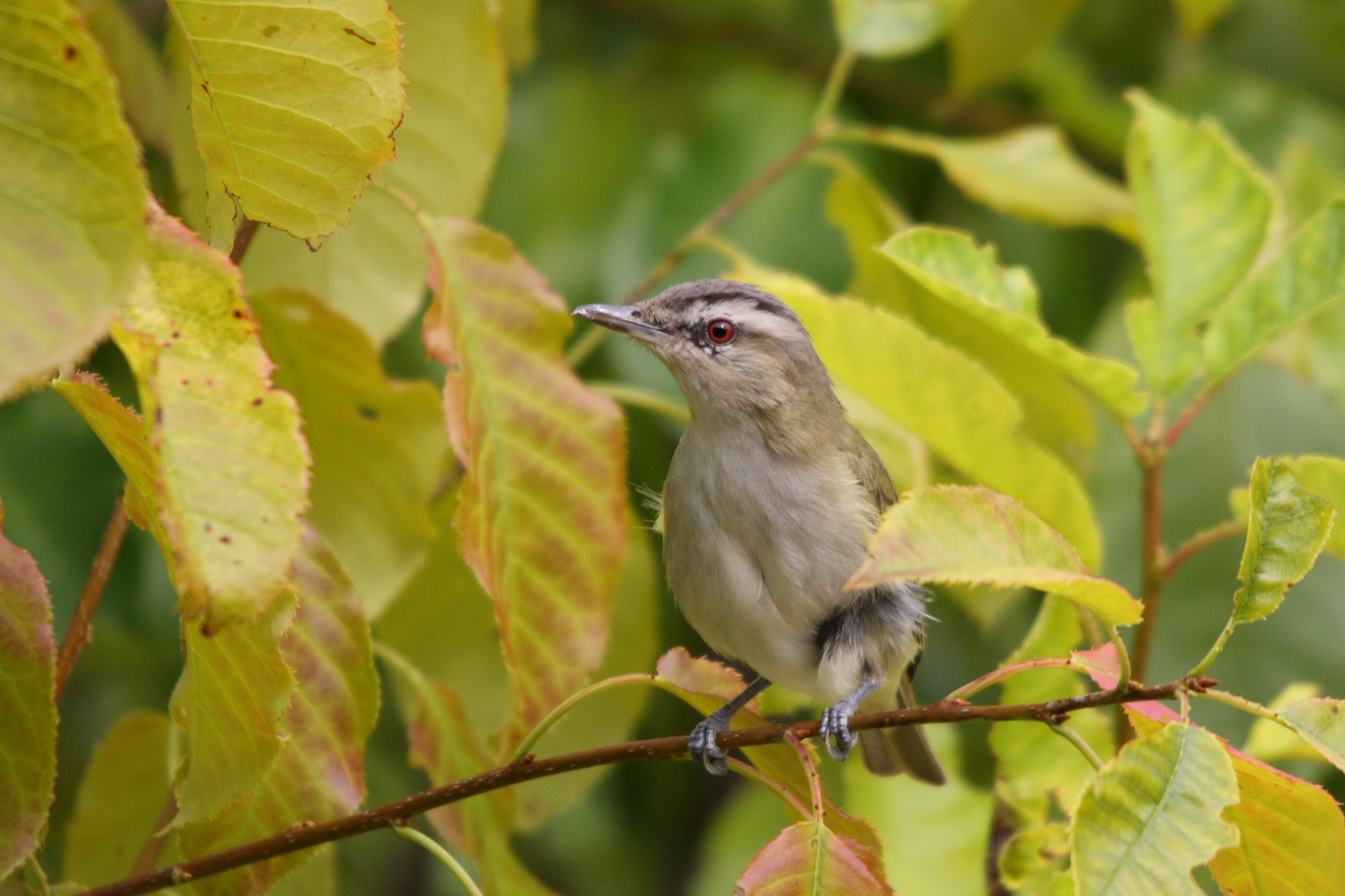
Red-eyed vireo

The vireos are a group of small to medium-sized passerines. They are typically greenish in color and resemble wood-warblers apart from their heavier bills. Seven species of vireo have been recorded in Georgia.

- White-eyed vireo, Vireo griseus
- Bell's vireo, Vireo bellii (R)
- Yellow-throated vireo, Vireo flavifrons
- Blue-headed vireo, Vireo solitarius
- Philadelphia vireo, Vireo philadelphicus
- Warbling vireo, Vireo gilvus
- Red-eyed vireo, Vireo olivaceus

== Shrikes ==
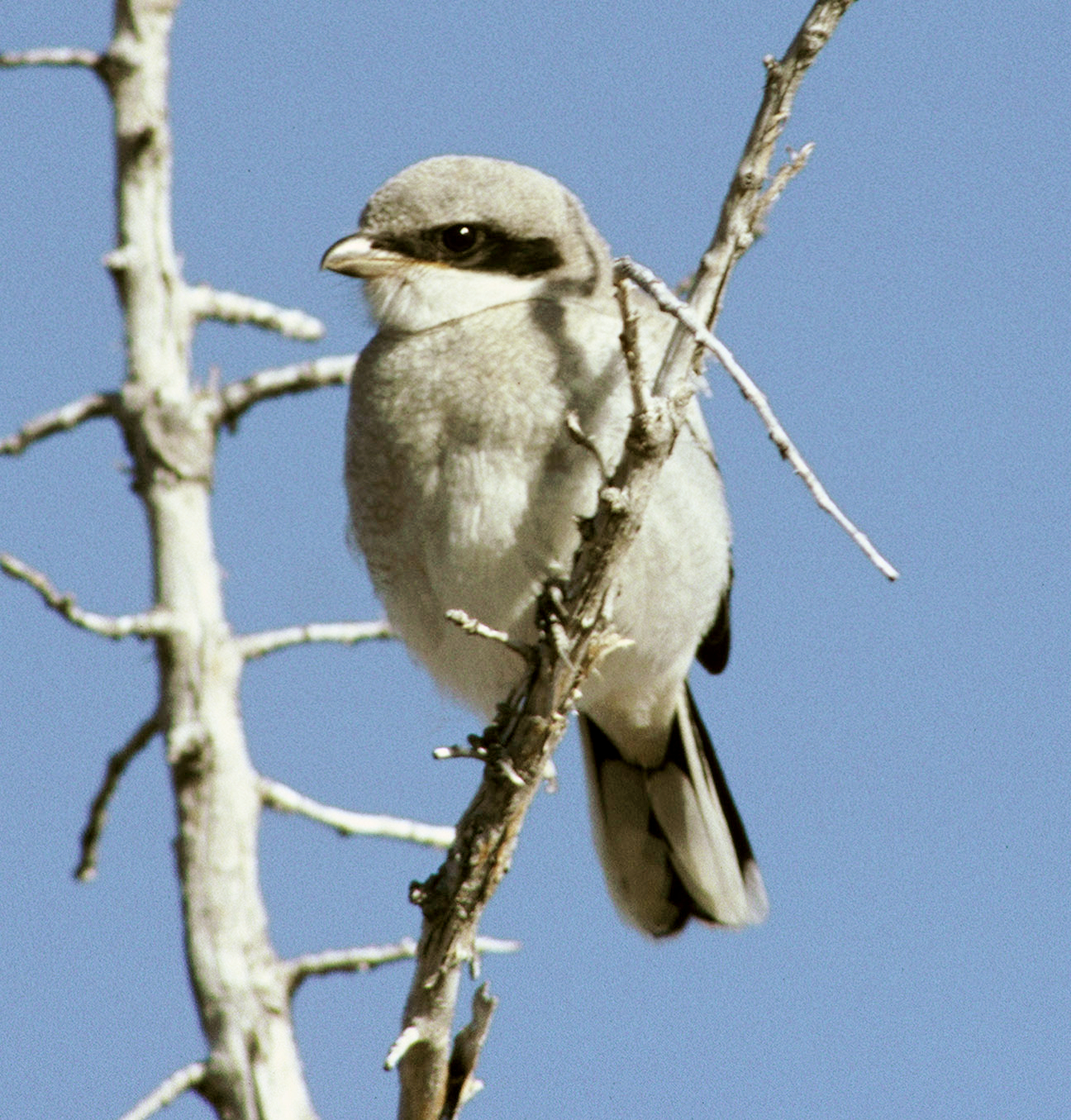
Loggerhead shrike

Order: Passeriformes Family: Laniidae

Shrikes are passerines known for their habit of catching other birds and small animals and impaling the uneaten portions of their bodies on thorns. A shrike's beak is hooked, like that of a typical bird of prey. One species of shrike has been recorded in Georgia.

- Loggerhead shrike, Lanius ludovicianus

== Crows, jays, and magpies ==
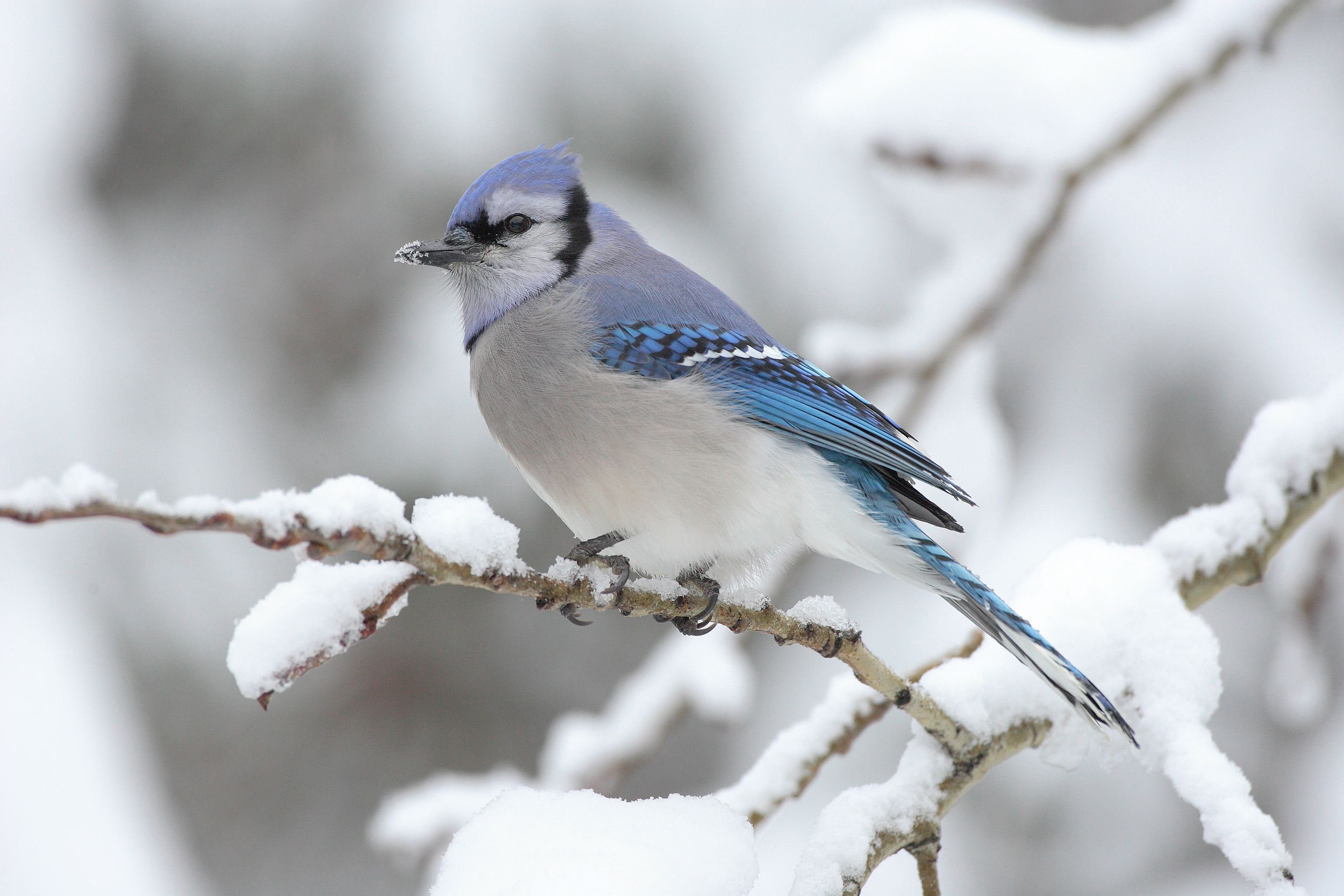
Blue jay

Order: Passeriformes Family: Corvidae

The family Corvidae includes crows, ravens, jays, choughs, magpies, treepies, nutcrackers, and ground jays. Corvids are above average in size among the Passeriformes, and some of the larger species show high levels of intelligence. Five species of corvids have been recorded in Georgia.

- Blue jay, Cyanocitta cristata
- Florida scrub-jay, Aphelocoma coerulescens (R)
- American crow, Corvus brachyrhynchos
- Fish crow, Corvus ossifragus
- Common raven, Corvus corax

== Tits, chickadees, and titmice ==
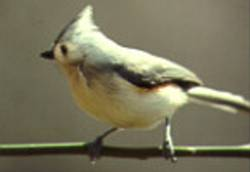
Tufted titmouse

Order: Passeriformes Family: Paridae

The Paridae are mainly small stocky woodland species with short stout bills. Some have crests. They are adaptable birds, with a mixed diet including seeds and insects. Two species of parids have been recorded in Georgia.

- Carolina chickadee, Poecile carolinensis
- Tufted titmouse, Baeolophus bicolor

== Larks ==
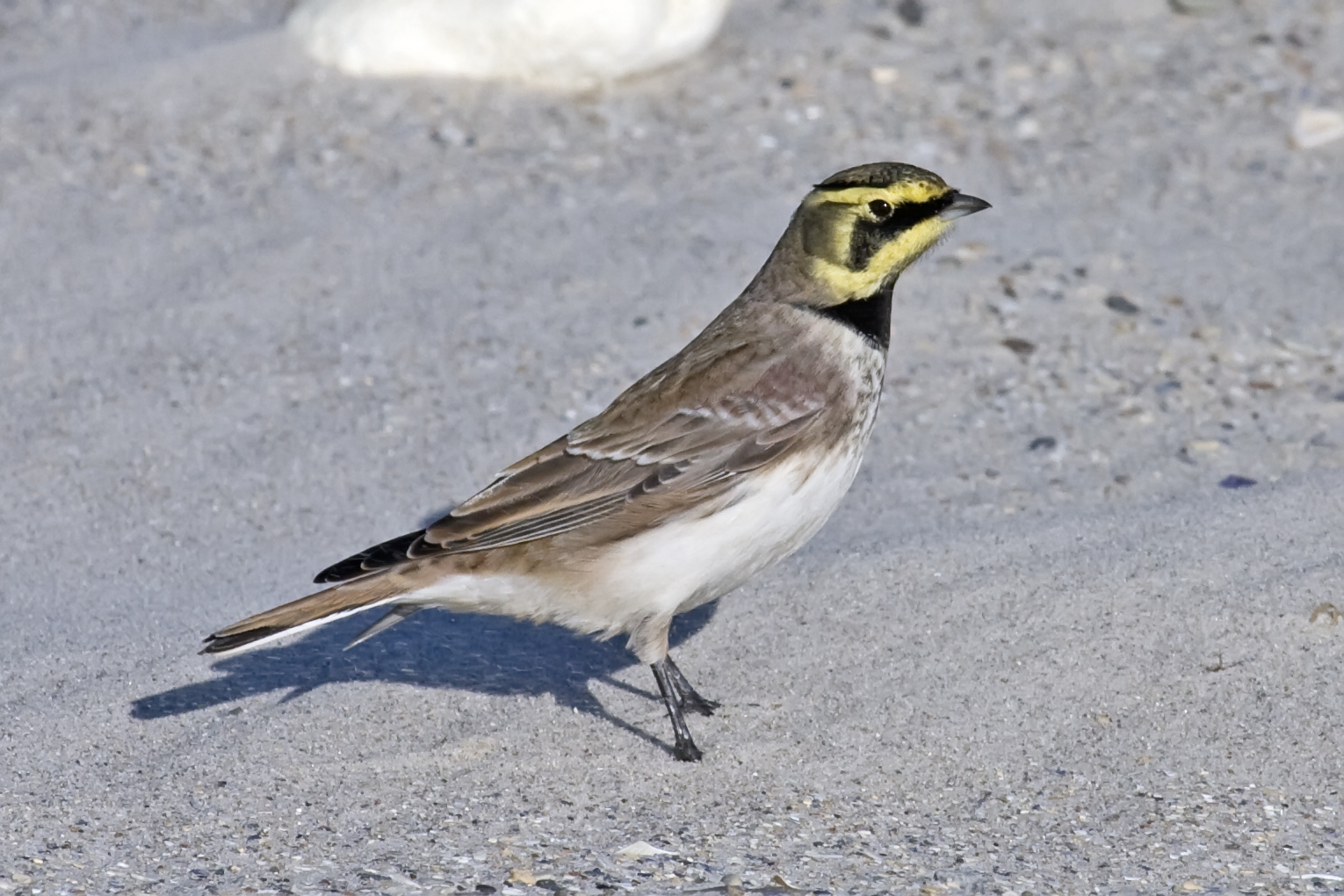
Horned lark

Order: Passeriformes Family: Alaudidae

Larks are small terrestrial birds with often extravagant songs and display flights. Most larks are fairly dull in appearance. Their food is insects and seeds. One species of lark has been recorded in Georgia.

- Horned lark, Eremophila alpestris

== Swallows ==
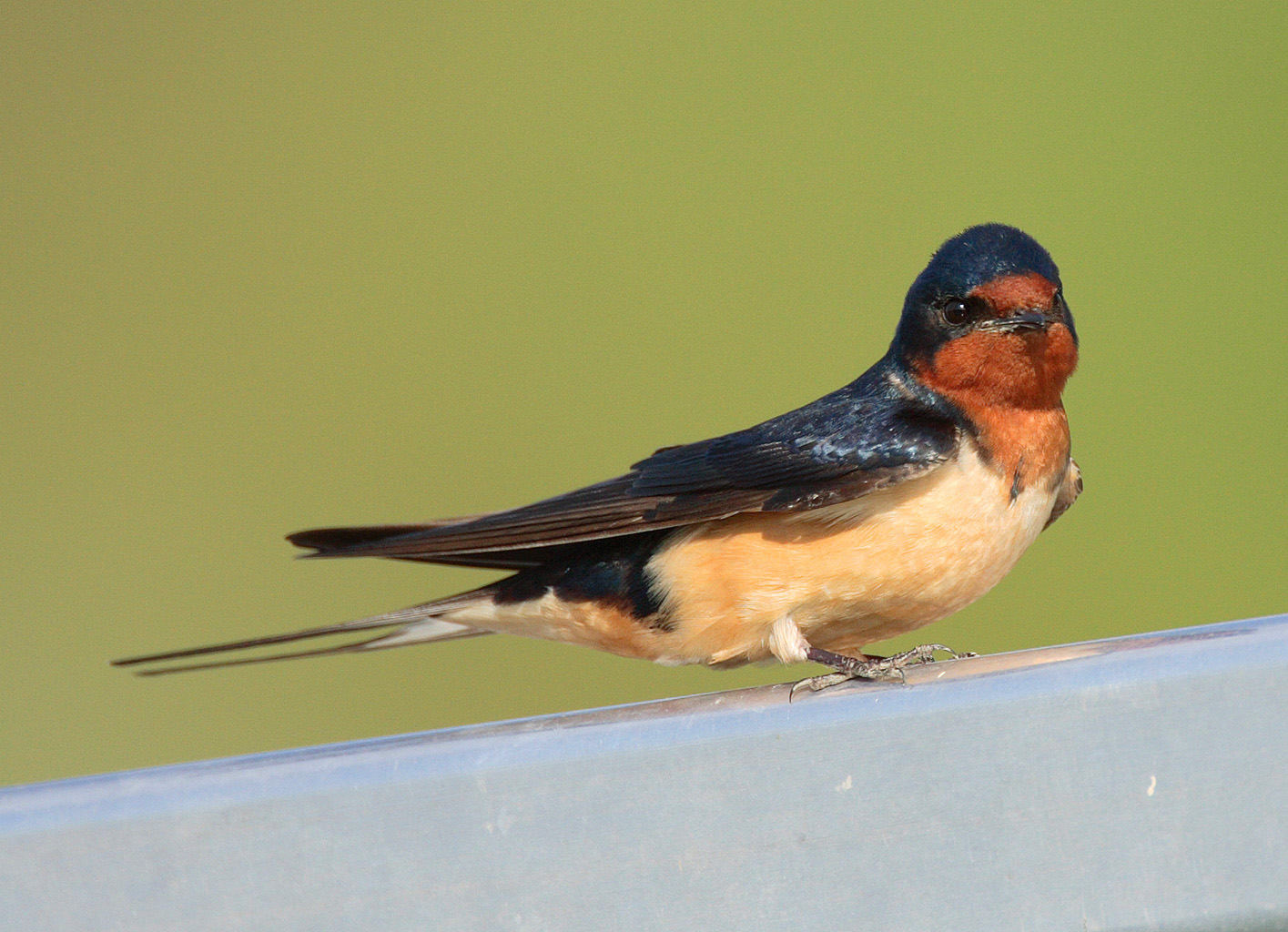
Barn swallow

Order: Passeriformes Family: Hirundinidae

The family Hirundinidae is adapted to aerial feeding. They have a slender streamlined body, long pointed wings, and a short bill with a wide gape. The feet are adapted to perching rather than walking, and the front toes are partly joined at the base. Seven species of swallows have been recorded in Georgia.

- Bank swallow, Riparia riparia
- Tree swallow, Tachycineta bicolor
- Northern rough-winged swallow, Stelgidopteryx serripennis
- Purple martin, Progne subis
- Barn swallow, Hirundo rustica
- Cliff swallow, Petrochelidon pyrrhonota
- Cave swallow, Petrochelidon fulva (R)

== Kinglets ==
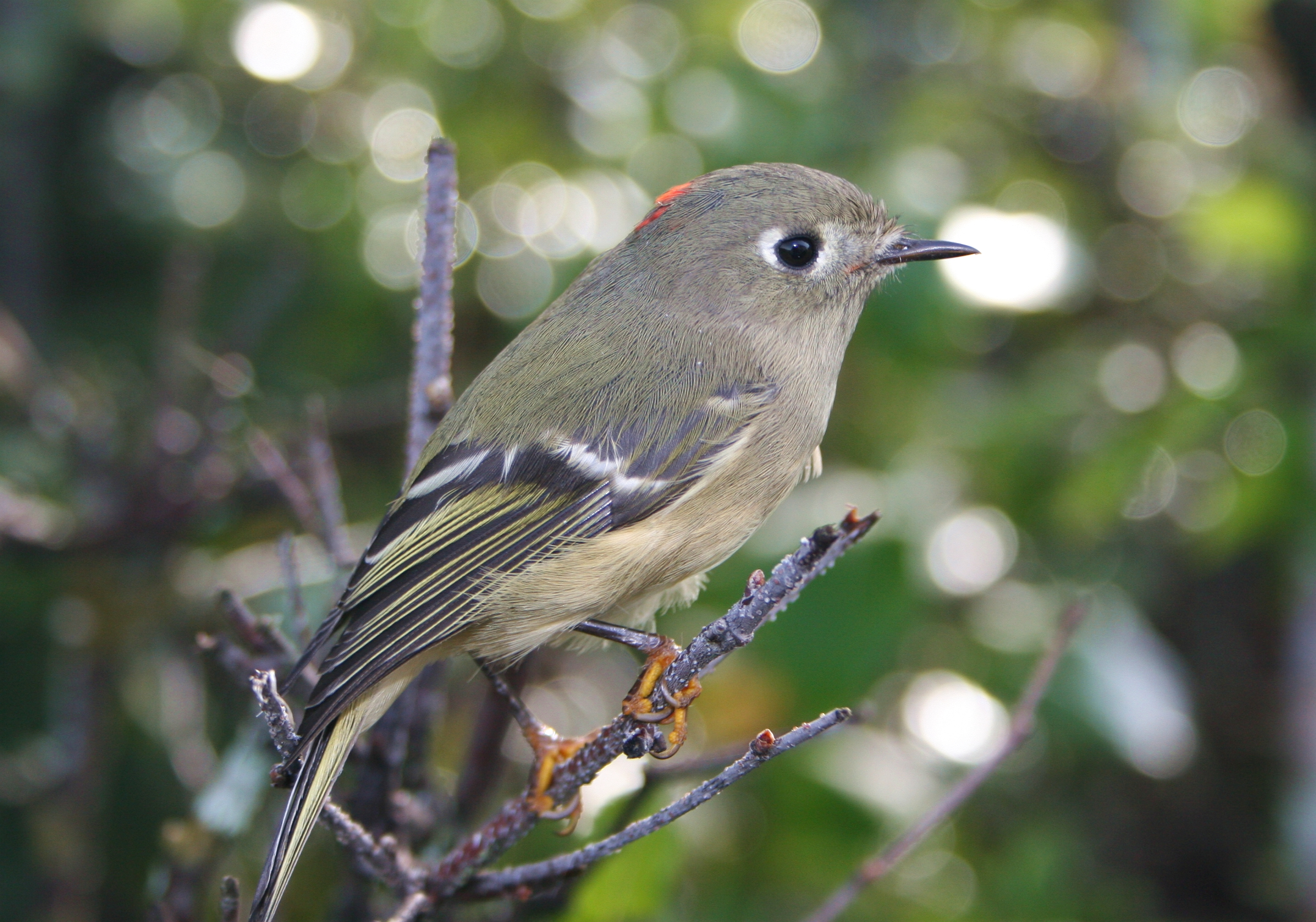
Ruby-crowned kinglet

Order: Passeriformes Family: Regulidae

The kinglets are a small family of birds which resemble the titmice. They are very small insectivorous birds in the genus Regulus. The adults have colored crowns, giving rise to their name. Two species of kinglet have been recorded in Georgia.

- Ruby-crowned kinglet, Corthylio calendula
- Golden-crowned kinglet, Regulus satrapa

== Waxwings ==
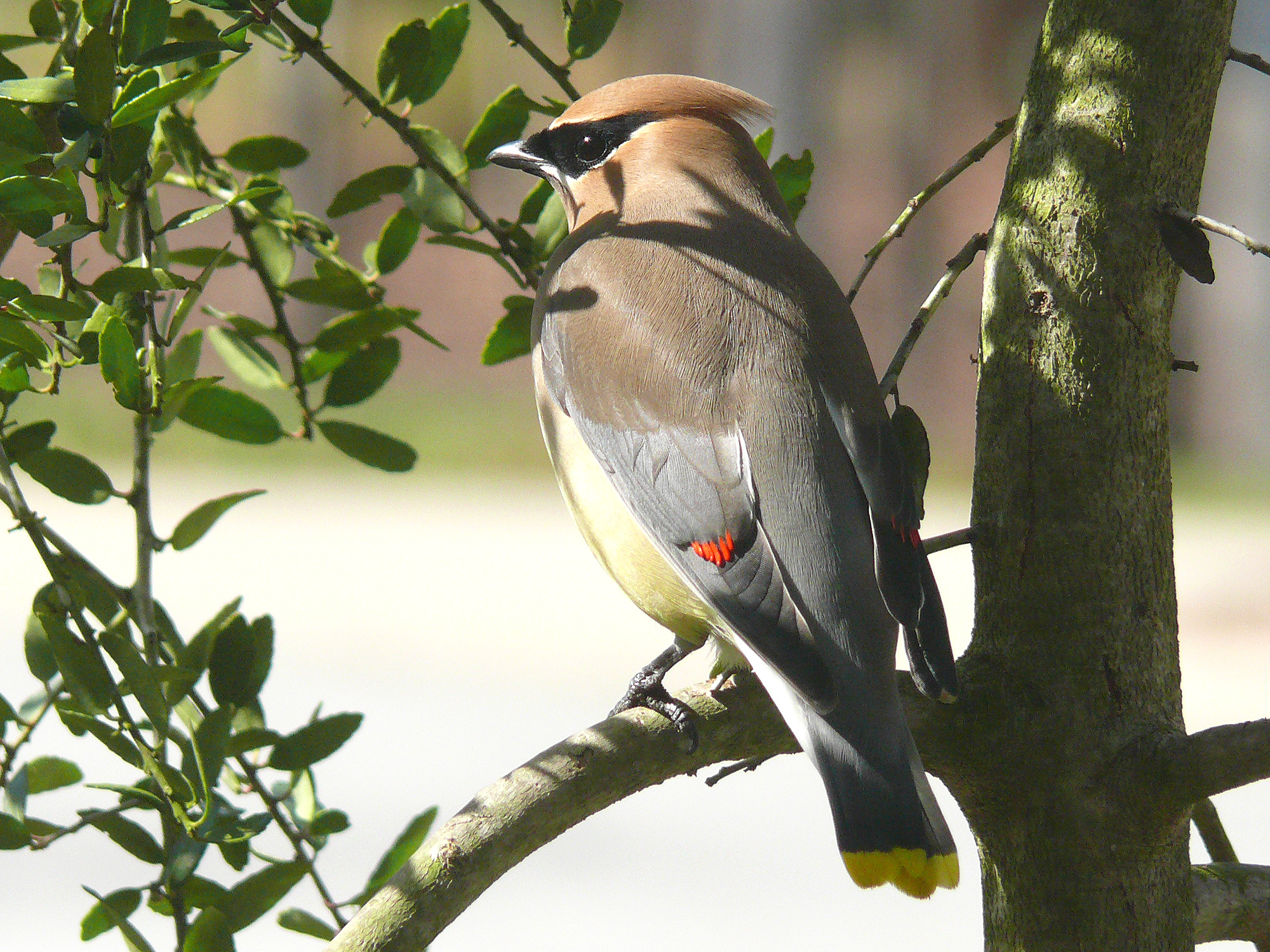
Cedar waxwing

Order: Passeriformes Family: Bombycillidae

The waxwings are a group of passerine birds with soft silky plumage and unique red tips to some of the wing feathers. In the Bohemian and cedar waxwings, these tips look like sealing wax and give the group its name. These are arboreal birds of northern forests. They live on insects in summer and berries in winter. One species of waxwing has been recorded in Georgia.

- Cedar waxwing, Bombycilla cedrorum

== Nuthatches ==
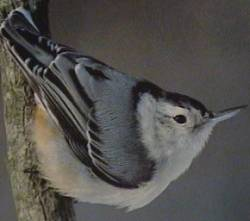
White-breasted nuthatch

Order: Passeriformes Family: Sittidae

Nuthatches are small woodland birds. They have the unusual ability to climb down trees head first, unlike most other birds which can only go upwards. Nuthatches have big heads, short tails, and powerful bills and feet. Three species of nuthatches have been recorded in Georgia.

- Red-breasted nuthatch, Sitta canadensis
- White-breasted nuthatch, Sitta carolinensis
- Brown-headed nuthatch, Sitta pusilla

== Treecreepers ==
Order: Passeriformes Family: Certhiidae

Treecreepers are small woodland birds, brown above and white below. They have thin pointed down-curved bills, which they use to extricate insects from bark. They have stiff tail feathers, like woodpeckers, which they use to support themselves on vertical trees. A single species of treecreeper has been recorded in Georgia.

- Brown creeper, Certhia americana

== Gnatcatchers ==
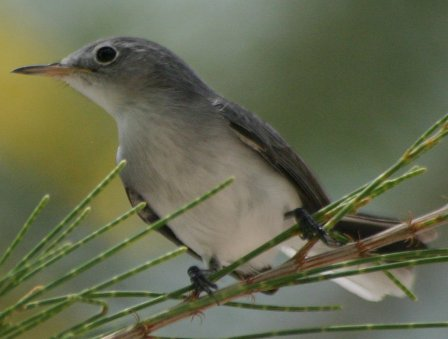
Blue-gray gnatcatcher

Order: Passeriformes Family: Polioptilidae

The family Polioptilidae is a group of small insectivorous passerine birds containing the gnatcatchers and gnatwrens. One species of gnatcatcher has been recorded in Georgia.

- Blue-gray gnatcatcher, Polioptila caerulea

== Wrens ==
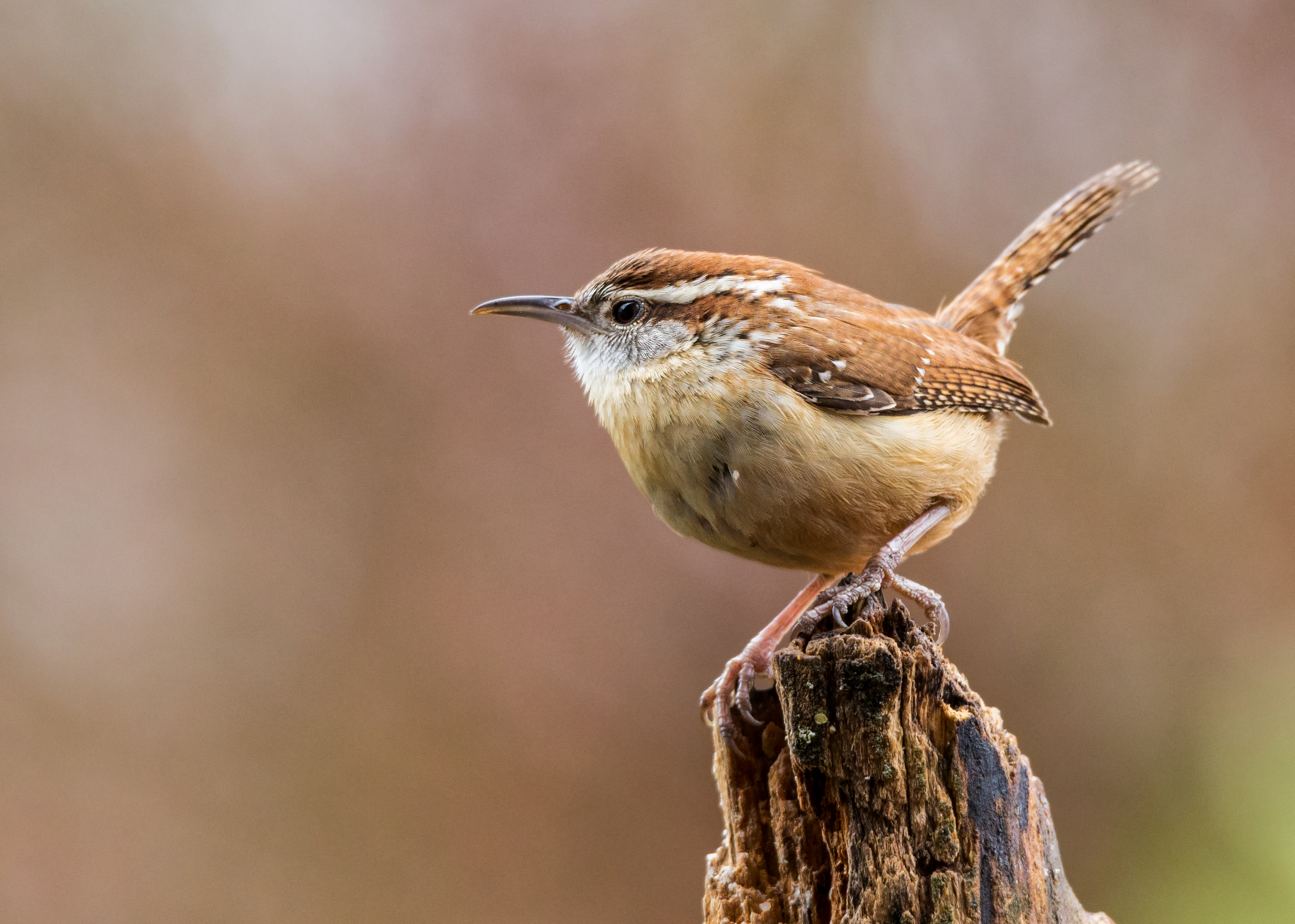
Carolina wren

Order: Passeriformes Family: Troglodytidae

Wrens are small and inconspicuous birds, except for their loud songs. They have short wings and thin down-turned bills. Several species often hold their tails upright. All are insectivorous. Seven species of wren have been recorded in Georgia.

- Rock wren, Salpinctes obsoletus (accidental)
- House wren, Troglodytes aedon
- Winter wren, Troglodytes hyemalis
- Sedge wren, Cistothorus platensis
- Marsh wren, Cistothorus palustris
- Carolina wren, Thryothorus ludovicianus
- Bewick's wren, Thryomanes bewickii (R)

== Mockingbirds and thrashers ==
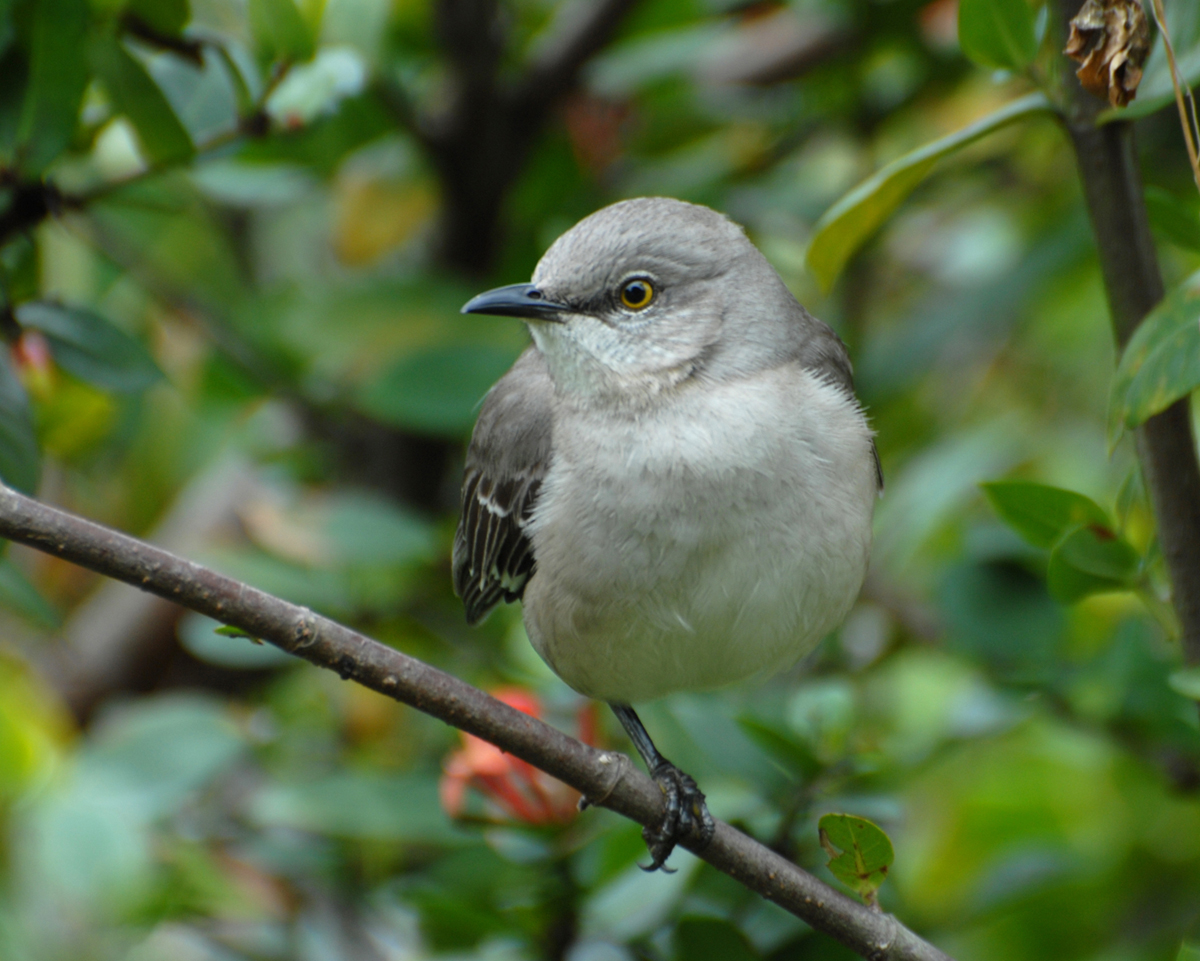
Northern mockingbird

Order: Passeriformes Family: Mimidae

The Mimidae, or mimic thrushes, are a family of passerine birds which includes thrashers, mockingbirds, tremblers, and the New World catbirds. They are notable for their vocalization, especially their remarkable ability to mimic a wide variety of birds and other sounds heard outdoors. Four species of mimic thrush have been recorded in Georgia.

- Gray catbird, Dumetella carolinensis
- Brown thrasher, Toxostoma rufum
- Sage thrasher, Oreoscoptes montanus (R)
- Northern mockingbird, Mimus polyglottos

== Starlings ==
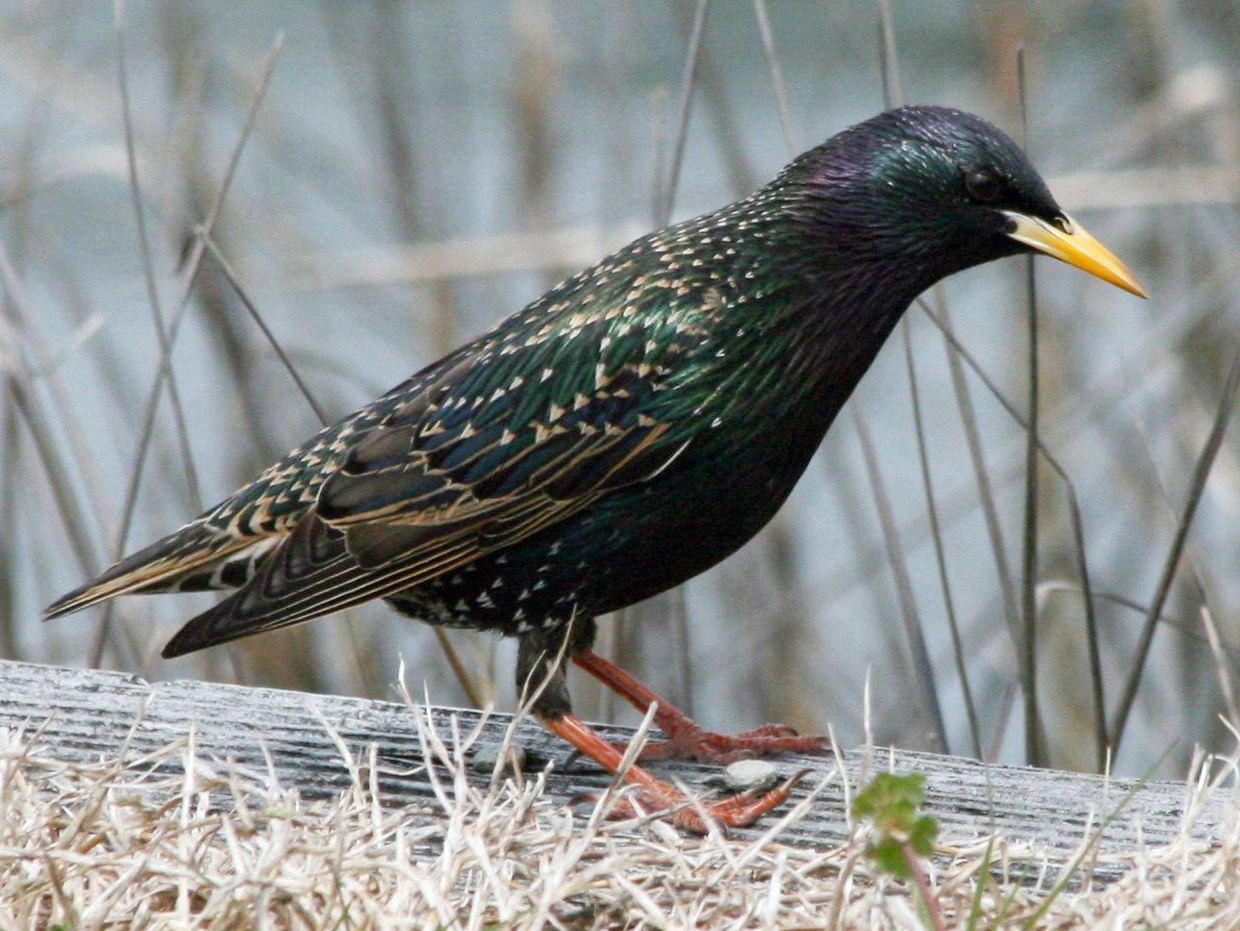
European starling

Order: Passeriformes Family: Sturnidae

Starlings are small to medium-sized passerines with strong feet. Their flight is strong and direct and they are very gregarious. Their preferred habitat is open country, and they eat insects and fruit. Their plumage is typically dark with a metallic sheen. A single species of starling is established in Georgia.

- European starling, Sturnus vulgaris (I)

== Thrushes and allies ==
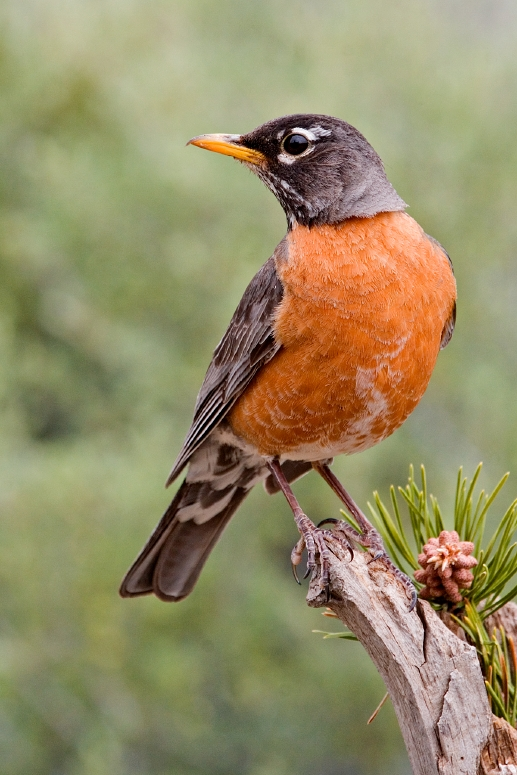
American robin

Order: Passeriformes Family: Turdidae

The thrushes are a group of passerine birds that occur mainly but not exclusively in the Old World. They are plump, soft plumaged, small to medium-sized insectivores or sometimes omnivores, often feeding on the ground. Many have attractive songs. Ten species of thrushes have been recorded in Georgia.

- Eastern bluebird, Sialia sialis
- Mountain bluebird, Sialia currucoides (R)
- Veery, Catharus fuscescens
- Gray-cheeked thrush, Catharus minimus
- Bicknell's thrush, Catharus bicknelli (R)
- Swainson's thrush, Catharus ustulatus
- Hermit thrush, Catharus guttatus
- Wood thrush, Hylocichla mustelina
- American robin, Turdus migratorius
- Varied thrush, Ixoreus naevius (R)

== Old World flycatchers ==
Order: Passeriformes Family: Muscicapidae

The Old World flycatchers form a large family of small passerine birds. These are mainly small arboreal insectivores, many of which, as the name implies, take their prey on the wing.

- Northern wheatear, Oenanthe oenanthe (R)

== Old World sparrows ==
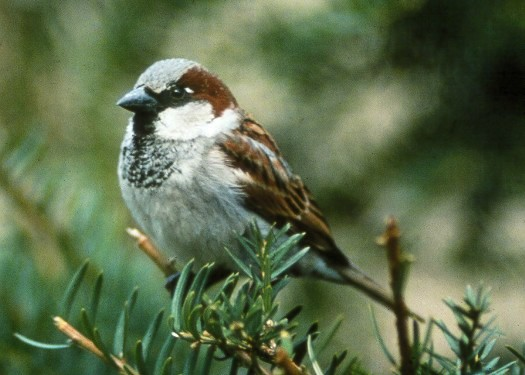
House sparrow

Order: Passeriformes Family: Passeridae

Old World sparrows, also known sometimes as weaver finches, are small passerine birds. In general, sparrows tend to be small plump brownish or grayish birds with short tails and short powerful beaks. Sparrows are seed eaters, but they also consume small insects. A single species of Old World sparrow is established in Georgia.

- House sparrow, Passer domesticus (I)

== Wagtails and pipits ==
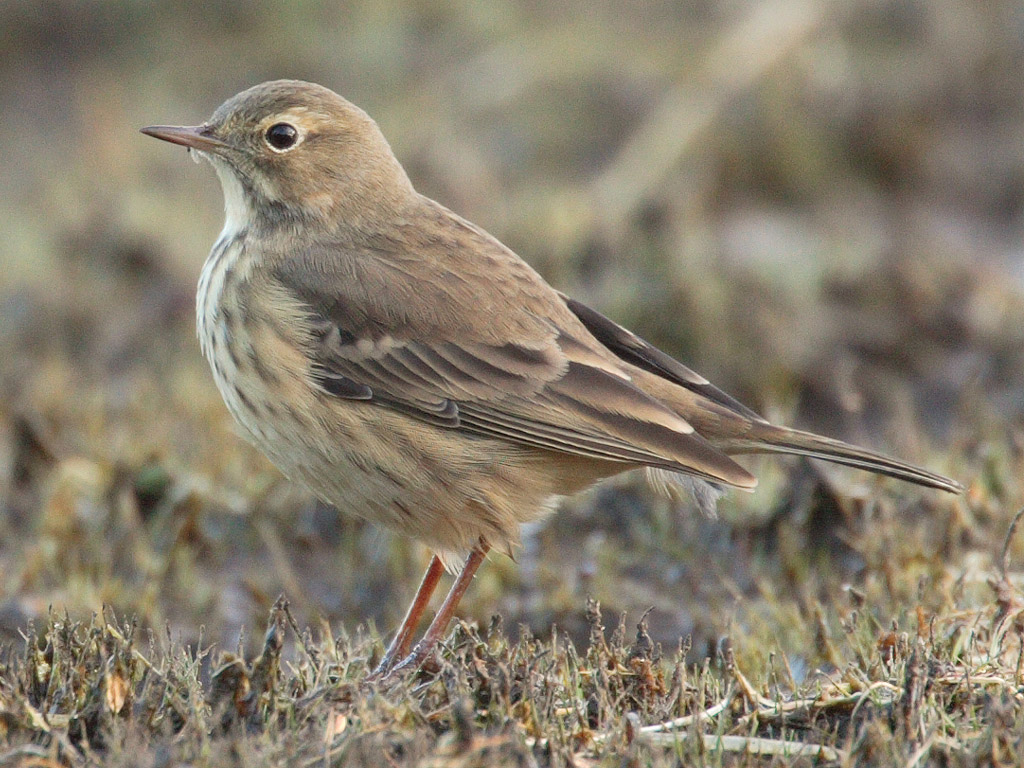
American pipit

Order: Passeriformes Family: Motacillidae

Motacillidae is a family of small passerine birds with medium to long tails. They include the wagtails, longclaws, and pipits. They are slender, ground-feeding insectivores of open country. Two species of pipit have been recorded in Georgia.

- American pipit, Anthus rubescens
- Sprague's pipit, Anthus spragueii (R)

== Finches, euphonias, and allies ==
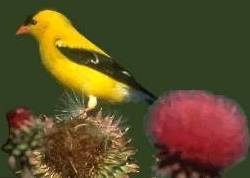
American goldfinch

Order: Passeriformes Family: Fringillidae

Finches are seed-eating passerines. They are small to moderately large and have strong, usually conical and sometimes very large, beaks. All have twelve tail feathers and nine primaries. They have a bouncing flight with alternating bouts of flapping and gliding on closed wings, and most sing well. Eight species of finches have been recorded in Georgia.

- Evening grosbeak, Coccothraustes vespertinus (R)
- House finch, Haemorhous mexicanus (native to the southwestern U.S.; introduced in the east)
- Common redpoll, Acanthis flammea (R)
- Purple finch, Haemorhous purpureus
- Red crossbill, Loxia curvirostra
- White-winged crossbill, Loxia leucoptera (R)
- Pine siskin, Spinus pinus
- American goldfinch, Spinus tristis

== Longspurs and snow buntings ==
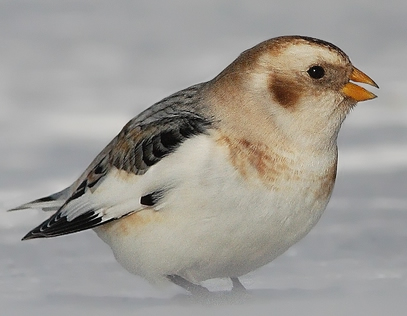
Snow bunting

Order: Passeriformes Family: Calcariidae

The Calcariidae are a group of passerine birds that had been traditionally grouped with the New World sparrows, but differ in a number of respects and are usually found in open grassy areas. Four species of Calcariidae have been recorded in Georgia.

- Lapland longspur, Calcarius lapponicus
- Smith's longspur, Calcarius pictus (R)
- Thick-billed longspur, Rhynchophanes mccownii (R)
- Snow bunting, Plectrophenax nivalis (R)

== New World sparrows ==
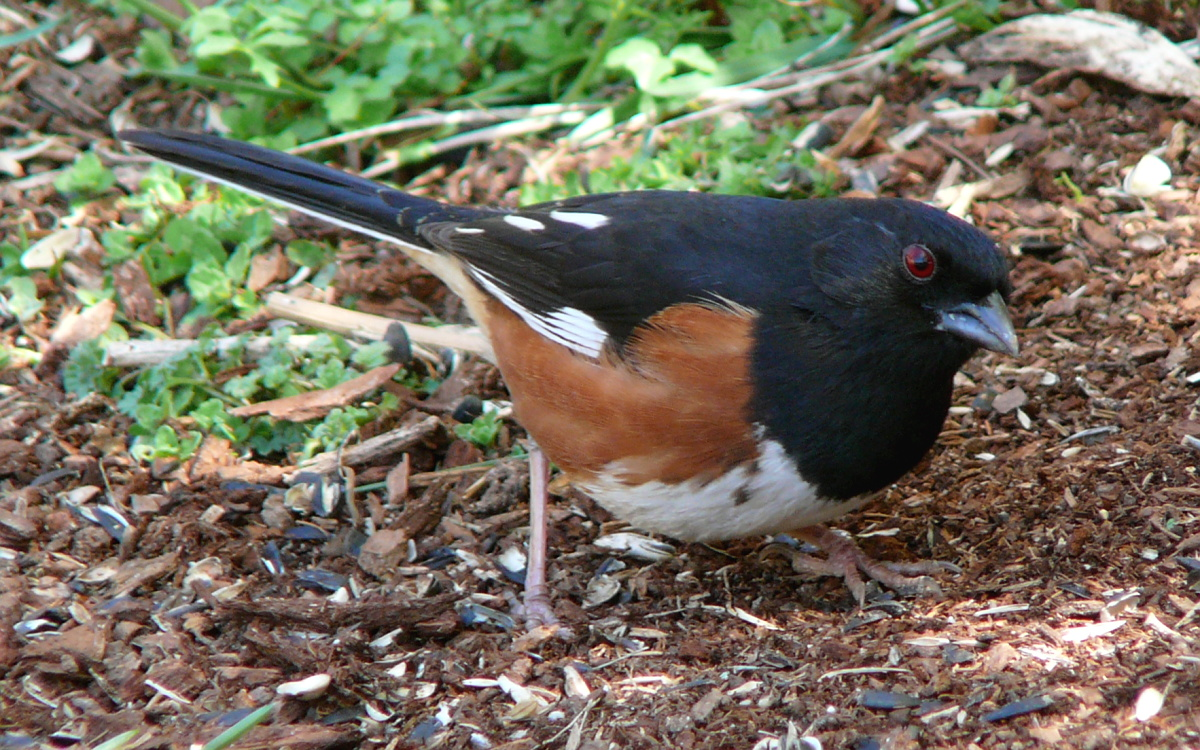
Eastern towhee

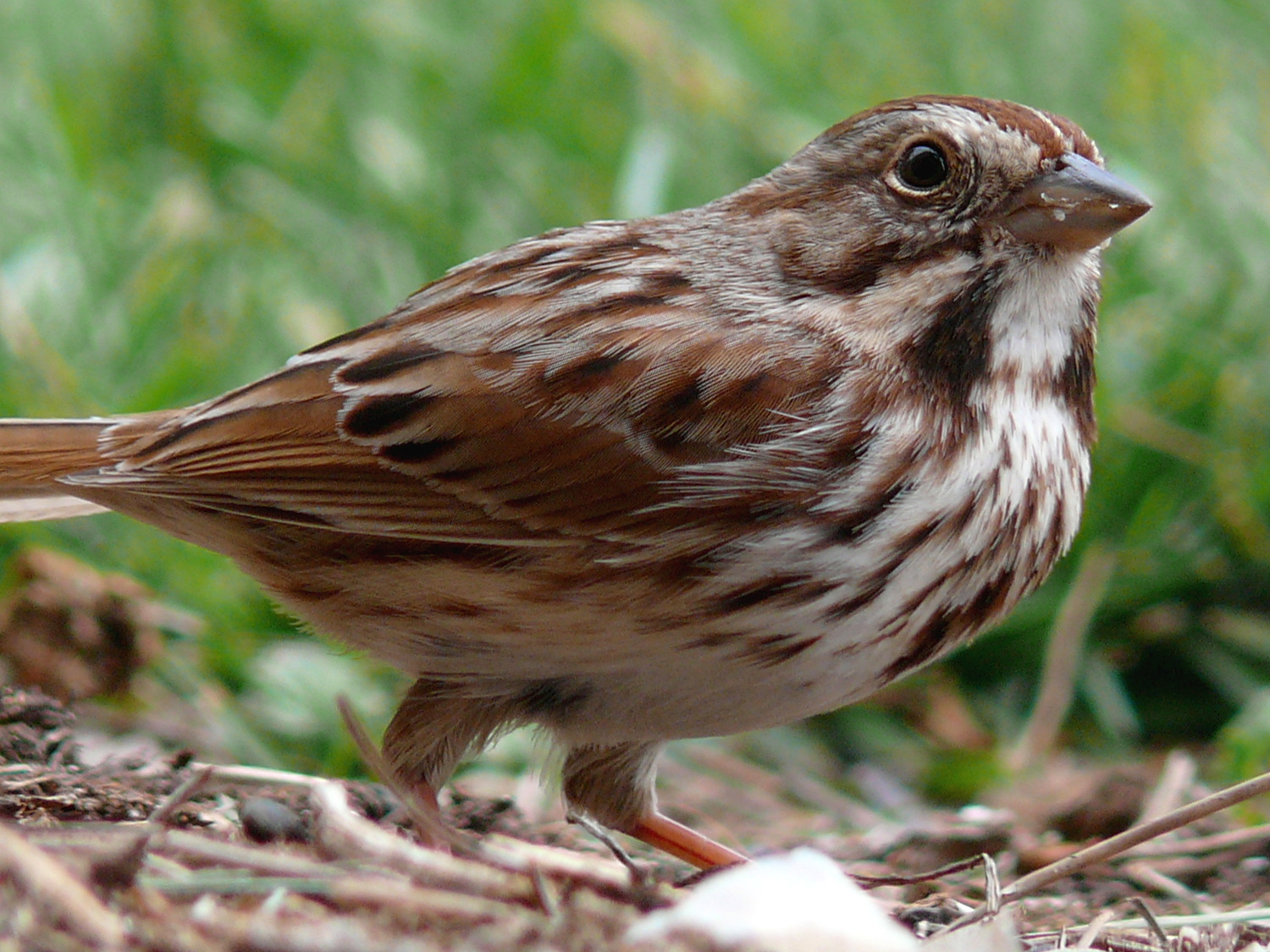
Song sparrow

Order: Passeriformes Family: Passerellidae

Until 2017, these species were considered part of the family Emberizidae. Most of the species are known as sparrows, but these birds are not closely related to the Old World sparrows which are in the family Passeridae. Many of these have distinctive head patterns. Twenty-seven species of Passerellidae have been recorded in Georgia.

- Bachman's sparrow, Peucaea aestivalis
- Grasshopper sparrow, Ammodramus savannarum
- Lark sparrow, Chondestes grammacus
- Lark bunting, Calamospiza melanocorys (R)
- Chipping sparrow, Spizella passerina
- Clay-colored sparrow, Spizella pallida
- Field sparrow, Spizella pusilla
- Fox sparrow, Passerella iliaca
- American tree sparrow, Spizelloides arborea (R)
- Dark-eyed junco, Junco hyemalis
- White-crowned sparrow, Zonotrichia leucophrys
- Harris's sparrow, Zonotrichia querula (R)
- White-throated sparrow, Zonotrichia albicollis
- Vesper sparrow, Pooecetes gramineus
- LeConte's sparrow, Ammospiza leconteii
- Seaside sparrow, Ammospiza maritima
- Nelson's sparrow, Ammospiza nelsoni
- Saltmarsh sparrow, Ammospiza caudacta
- Baird's sparrow, Centronyx bairdii (accidental)
- Henslow's sparrow, Centronyx henslowii
- Savannah sparrow, Passerculus sandwichensis
- Song sparrow, Melospiza melodia
- Lincoln's sparrow, Melospiza lincolnii
- Swamp sparrow, Melospiza georgiana
- Green-tailed towhee, Pipilo chlorurus (R)
- Spotted towhee, Pipilo maculatus (R)
- Eastern towhee, Pipilo erythrophthalmus

== Yellow-breasted chat ==
Order: Passeriformes Family: Icteriidae

This species was historically placed in the wood-warblers (Parulidae) but nonetheless most authorities were unsure if it belonged there. It was placed in its own family in 2017.

- Yellow-breasted chat, Icteria virens

== Troupials and allies ==
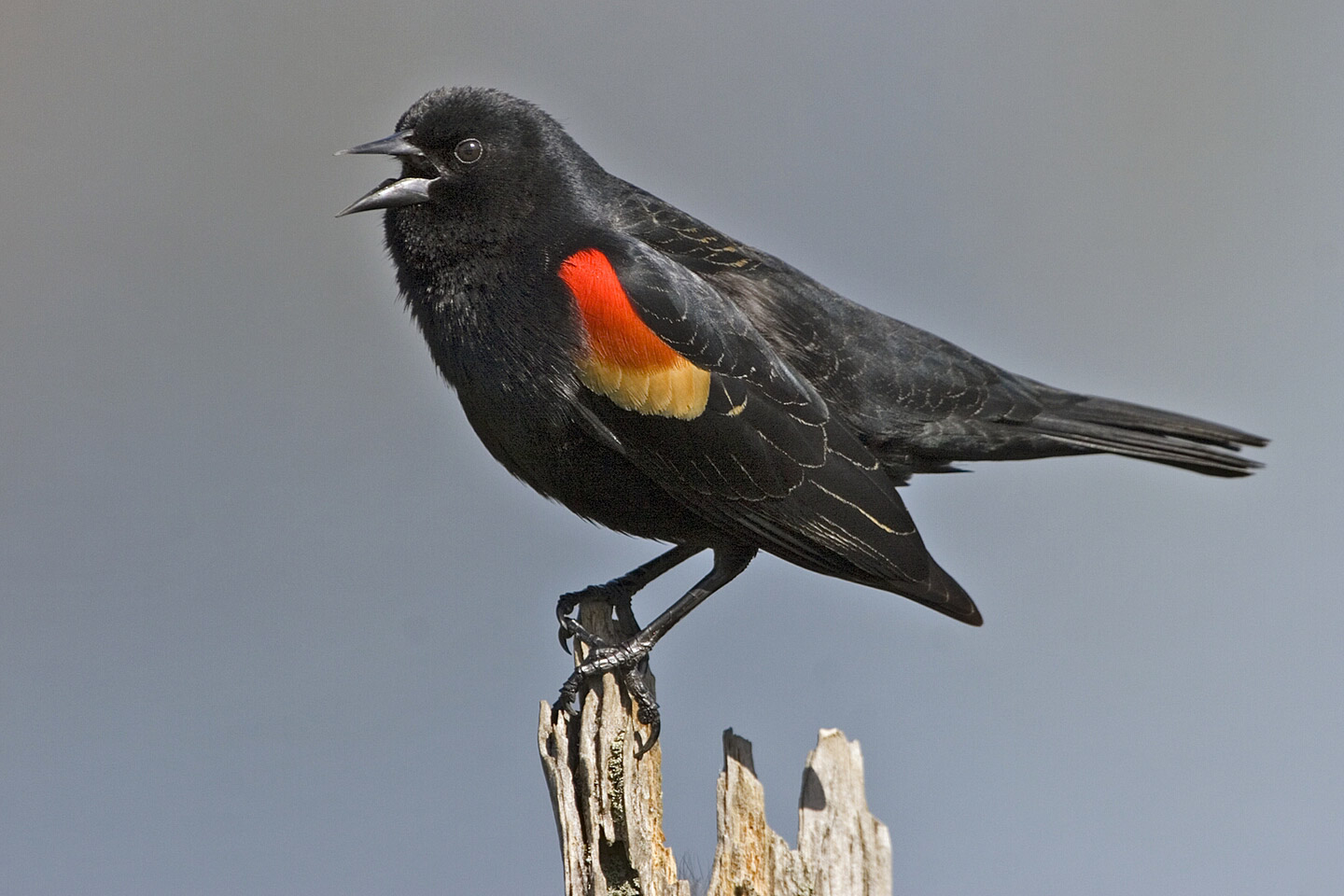
Red-winged blackbird

Order: Passeriformes Family: Icteridae

The icterids are a group of small to medium-sized, often colorful, passerines restricted to the New World, including the grackles, New World blackbirds, and New World orioles. Most have black as a predominant plumage color, often enlivened by yellow, orange, or red. Fifteen species of icterids have been recorded in Georgia.

- Yellow-headed blackbird, Xanthocephalus xanthocephalus
- Bobolink, Dolichonyx oryzivorus
- Eastern meadowlark, Sturnella magna
- Western meadowlark, Sturnella neglecta (R)
- Orchard oriole, Icterus spurius
- Bullock's oriole, Icterus bullockii (R)
- Baltimore oriole, Icterus galbula
- Scott's oriole, Icterus parisorum (R)
- Red-winged blackbird, Agelaius phoeniceus
- Shiny cowbird, Molothrus bonariensis (R)
- Brown-headed cowbird, Molothrus ater
- Rusty blackbird, Euphagus carolinus
- Brewer's blackbird, Euphagus cyanocephalus
- Common grackle, Quiscalus quiscula
- Boat-tailed grackle, Quiscalus major

== New World warblers ==
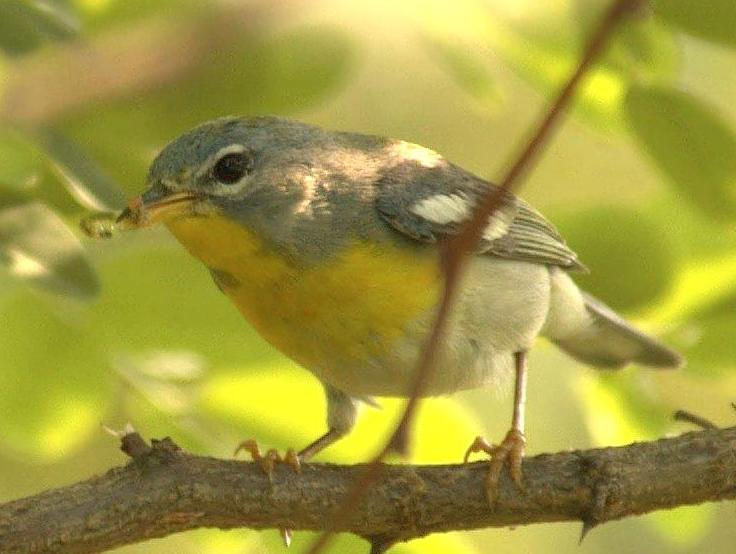
Northern parula

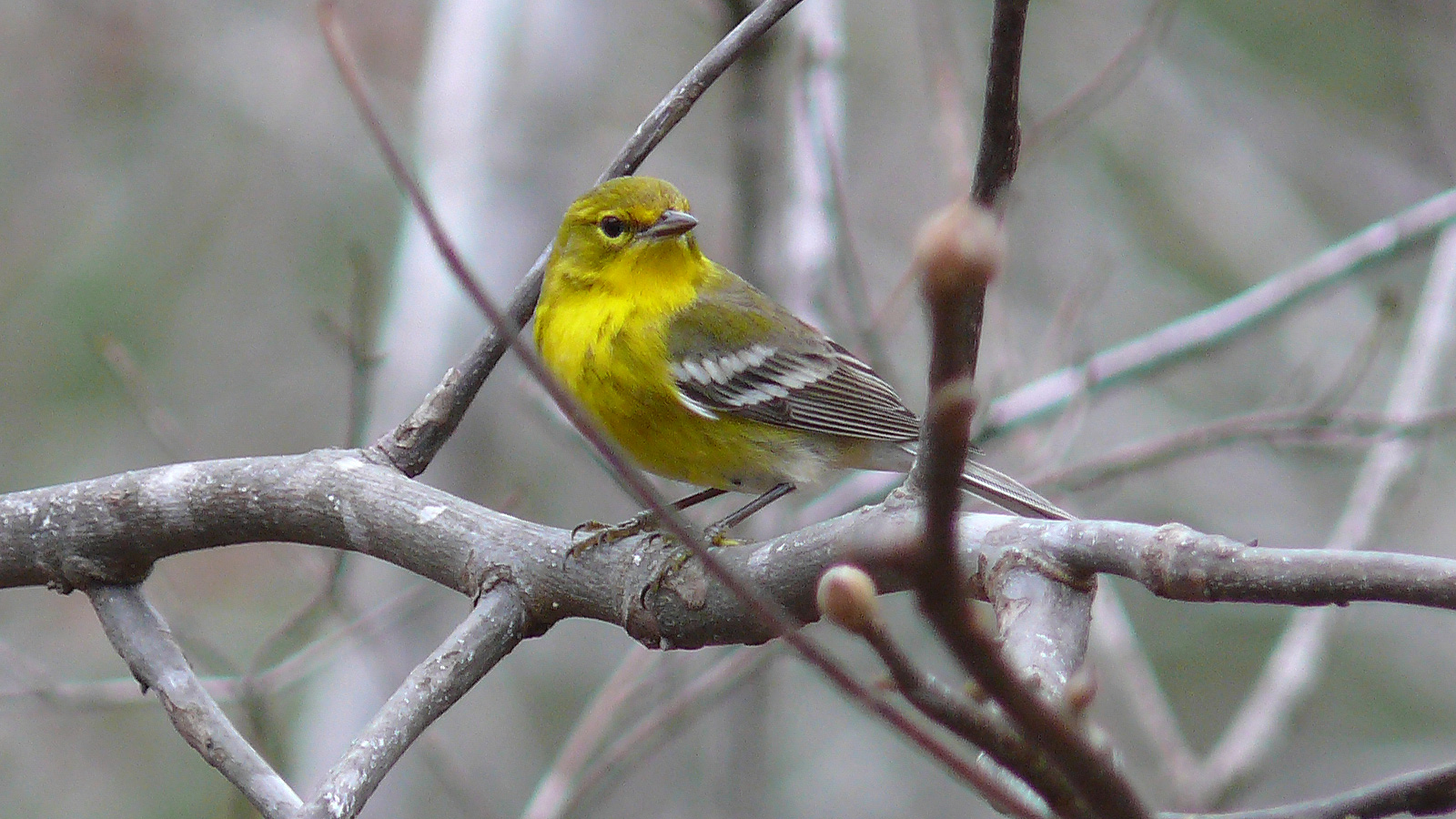
Pine warbler

Order: Passeriformes Family: Parulidae

The wood-warblers are a group of small, often colorful, passerines restricted to the New World. Most are arboreal, but some are terrestrial. Most members of this family are insectivores. Forty-three species of wood-warbler have been definitively recorded in Georgia, and another species is classed as provisional.

- Ovenbird, Seiurus aurocapilla
- Worm-eating warbler, Helmitheros vermivorum
- Louisiana waterthrush, Parkesia motacilla
- Northern waterthrush, Parkesia noveboracensis
- Golden-winged warbler, Vermivora chrysoptera
- Blue-winged warbler, Vermivora cyanoptera
- Black-and-white warbler, Mniotilta varia
- Prothonotary warbler, Protonotaria citrea
- Swainson's warbler, Limnothlypis swainsonii
- Tennessee warbler, Leiothlypis peregrina
- Orange-crowned warbler, Leiothlypis celata
- Nashville warbler, Leiothlypis ruficapilla
- Virginia's warbler, Leiothlypis virginiae (R)
- Connecticut warbler, Oporornis agilis
- MacGillivray's warbler, Geothlypis tolmiei (R)
- Mourning warbler, Geothlypis philadelphia
- Kentucky warbler, Geothlypis formosa
- Common yellowthroat, Geothlypis trichas
- Hooded warbler, Setophaga citrina
- American redstart, Setophaga ruticilla
- Kirtland's warbler, Setophaga kirtlandii (R)
- Cape May warbler, Setophaga tigrina
- Cerulean warbler, Setophaga cerulea
- Northern parula, Setophaga americana
- Magnolia warbler, Setophaga magnolia
- Bay-breasted warbler, Setophaga castanea
- Blackburnian warbler, Setophaga fusca
- Yellow warbler, Setophaga petechia
- Chestnut-sided warbler, Setophaga pensylvanica
- Blackpoll warbler, Setophaga striata
- Black-throated blue warbler, Setophaga caerulescens
- Palm warbler, Setophaga palmarum
- Pine warbler, Setophaga pinus
- Yellow-rumped warbler, Setophaga coronata
- Yellow-throated warbler, Setophaga dominica
- Prairie warbler, Setophaga discolor
- Black-throated gray warbler, Setophaga nigrescens (R)
- Townsend's warbler, Setophaga townsendi (R)
- Black-throated green warbler, Setophaga virens
- Canada warbler, Cardellina canadensis
- Wilson's warbler, Cardellina pusilla
- Red-faced warbler, Cardellina rubrifrons (R)
- Painted redstart, Myioborus pictus (P)

== Cardinals and allies ==
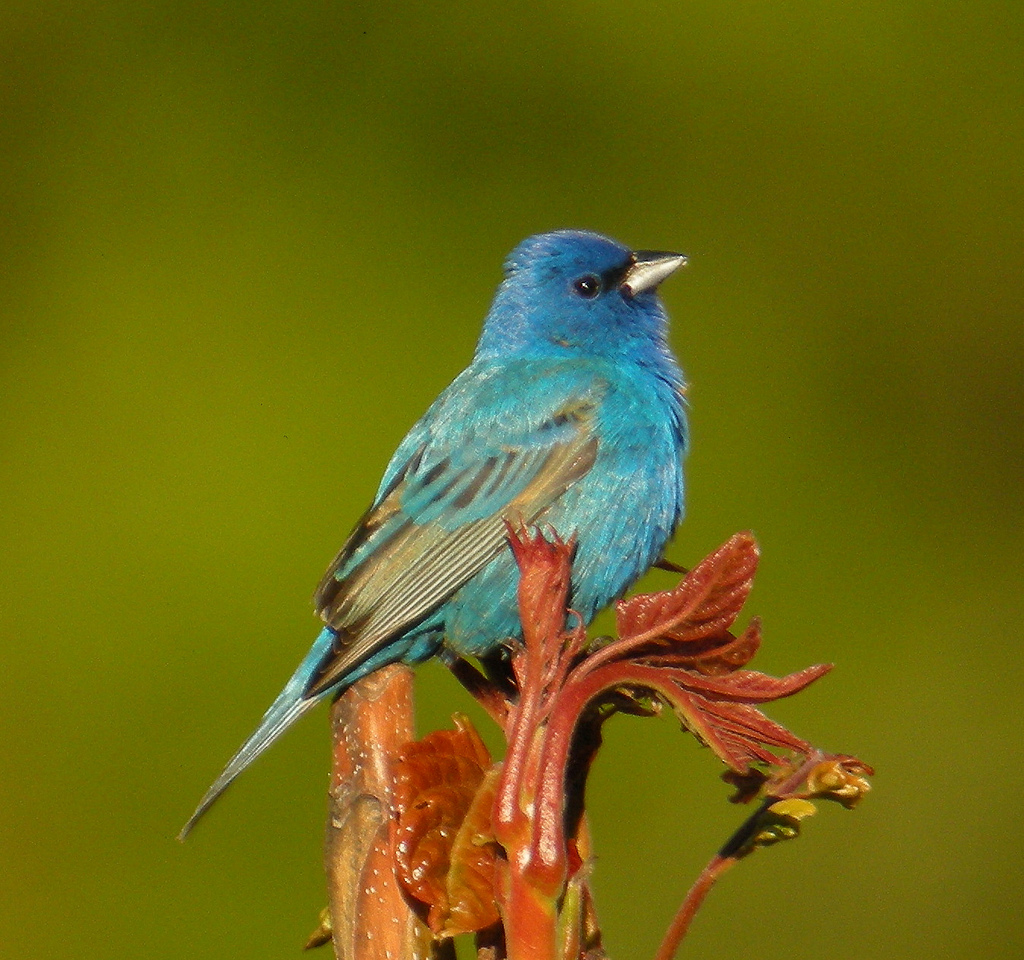
Indigo bunting

Order: Passeriformes Family: Cardinalidae

The cardinals are a family of robust seed-eating birds with strong bills. They are typically associated with open woodland. The sexes usually have distinct plumages. Eleven species of cardinalidae have been recorded in Georgia.

- Summer tanager, Piranga rubra
- Scarlet tanager, Piranga olivacea
- Western tanager, Piranga ludoviciana
- Northern cardinal, Cardinalis cardinalis
- Rose-breasted grosbeak, Pheucticus ludovicianus
- Black-headed grosbeak, Pheucticus melanocephalus (R)
- Blue grosbeak, Passerina caerulea
- Indigo bunting, Passerina cyanea
- Lazuli bunting, Passerina amoena (R)
- Painted bunting, Passerina ciris
- Dickcissel, Spiza americana

== See also ==
- List of North American birds
