= New England =

Region in the Northeastern United States

- Region
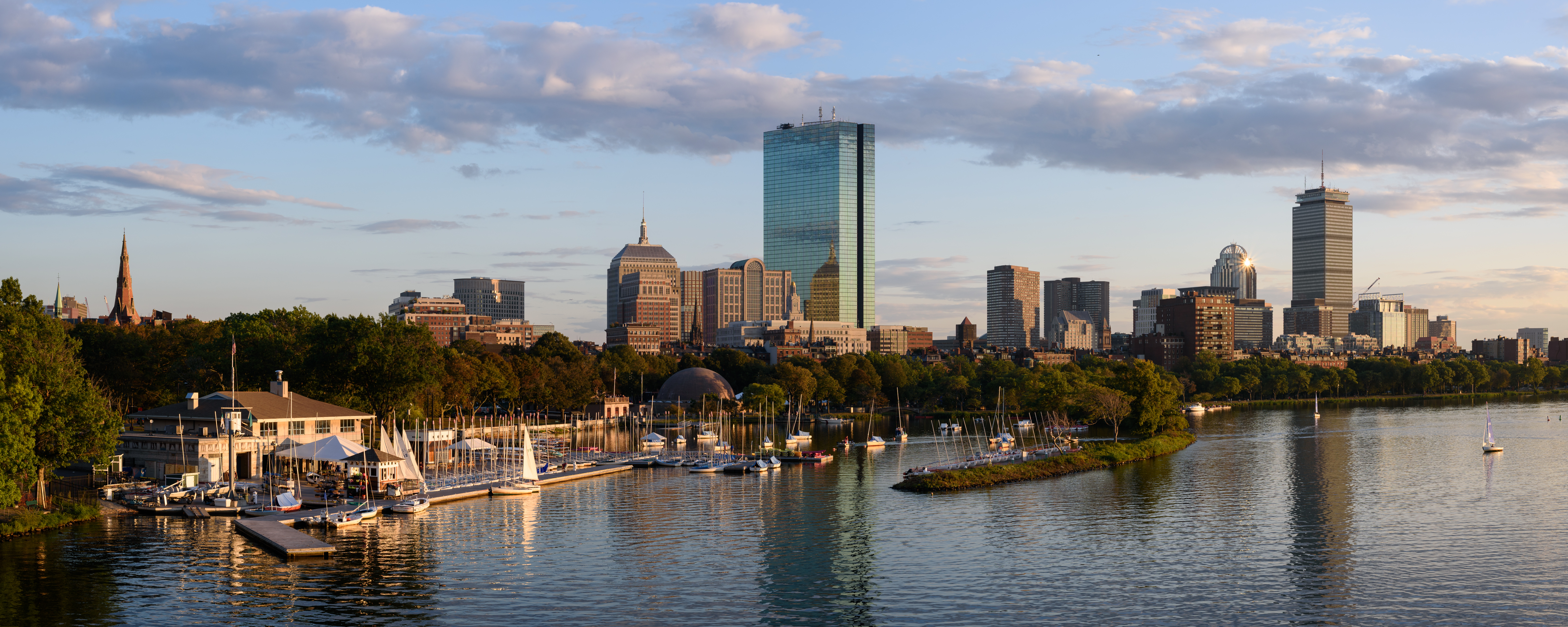
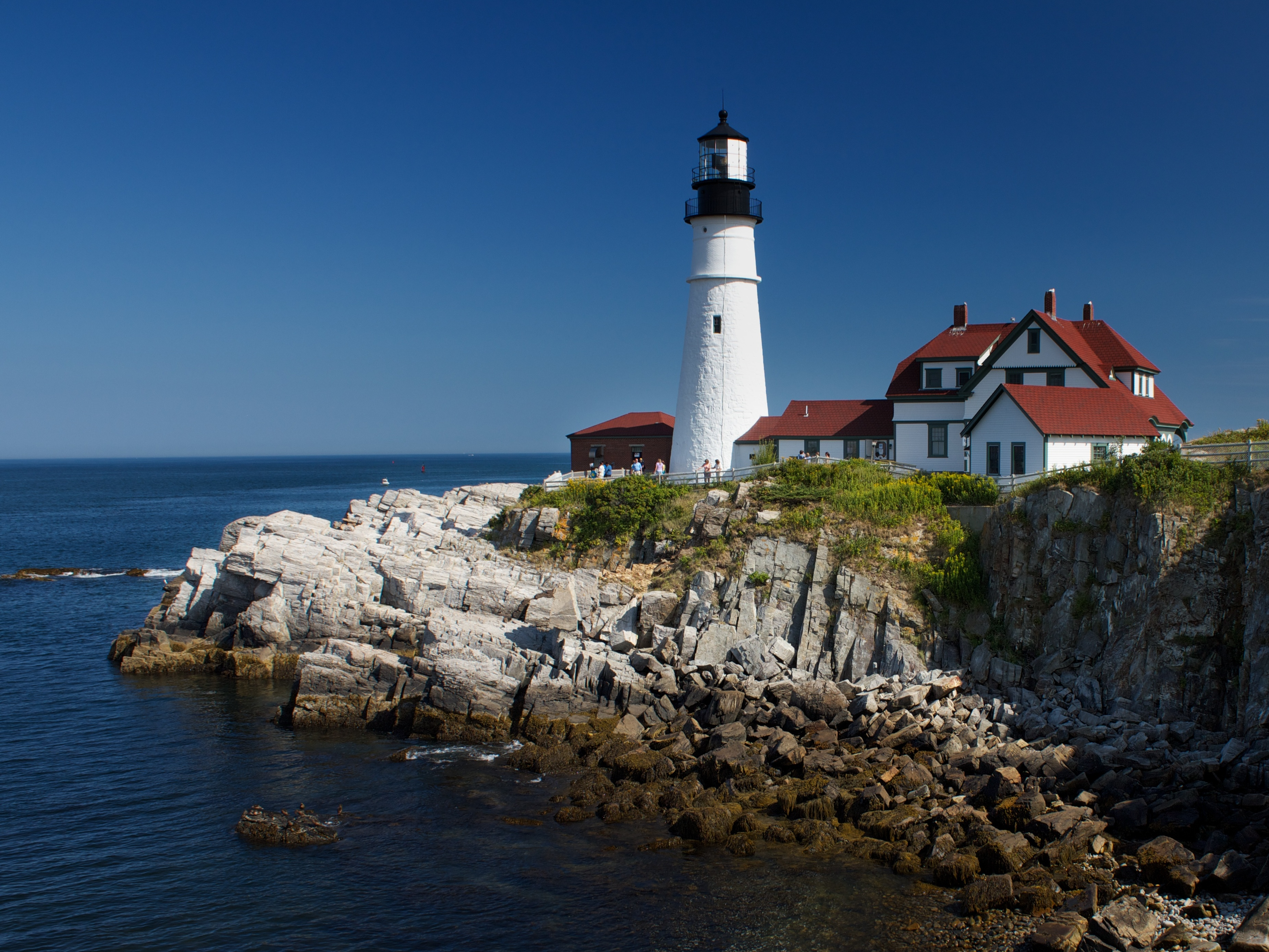
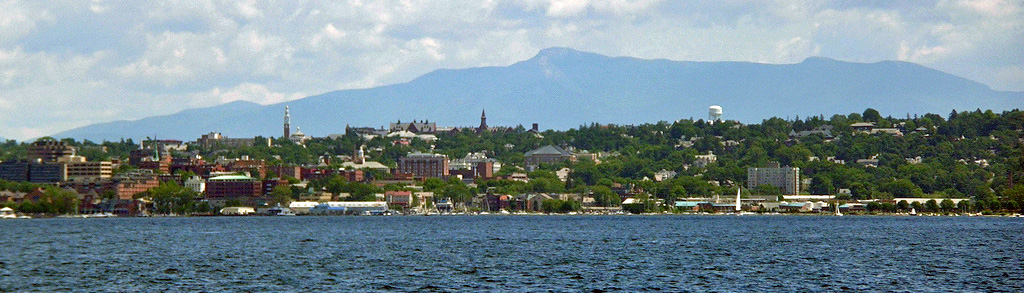
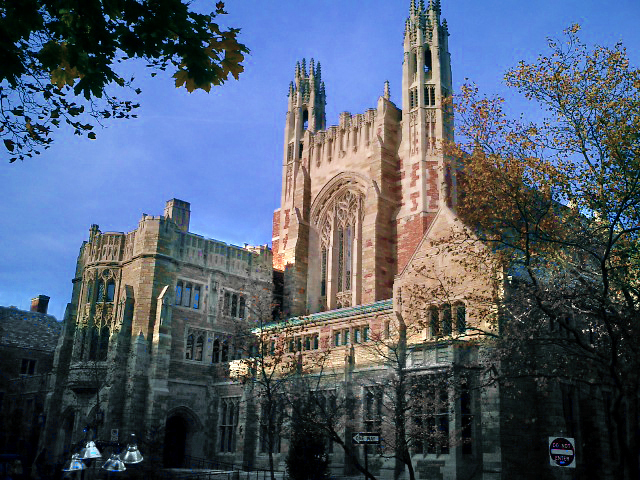
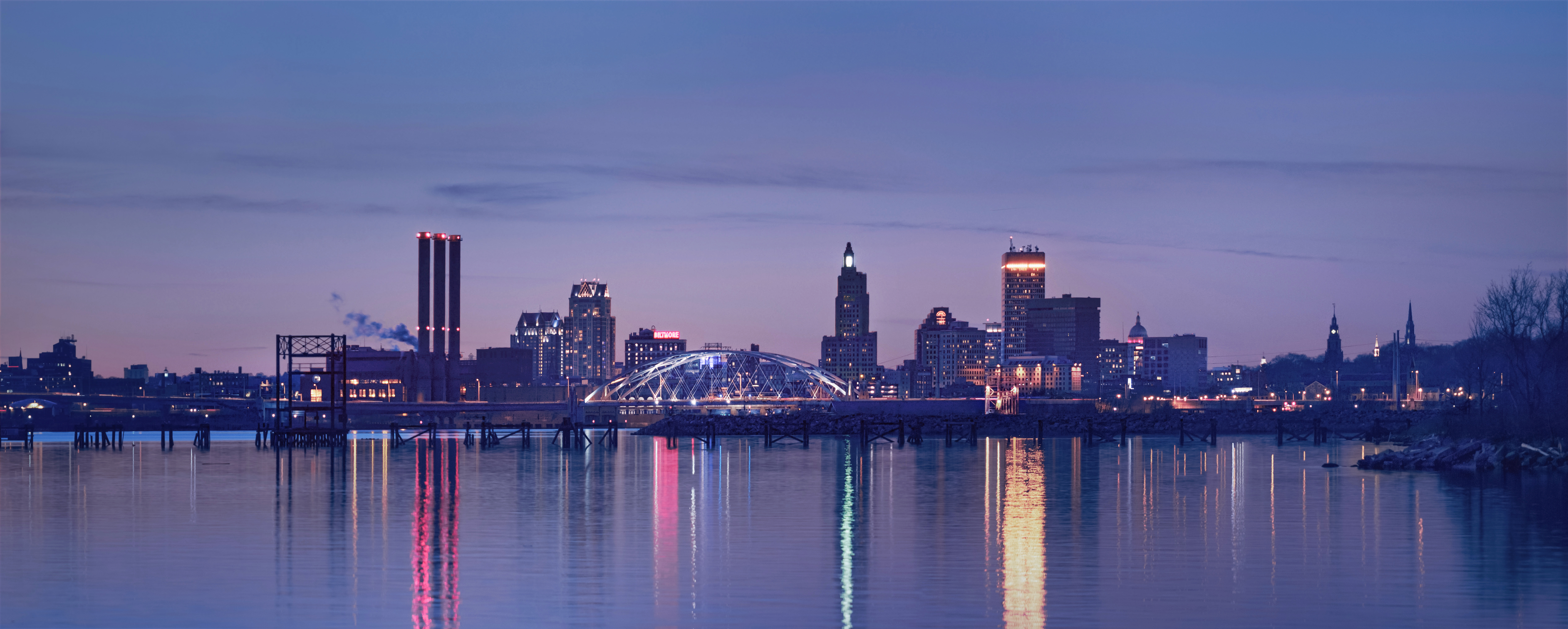
- Boston Portland Head Light Foliage and a covered bridge in New Hampshire Burlington Gay Head Cliffs Sterling Law Building at Yale University Providence

- Flag (unofficial)
- Motto: None official. "An Appeal to Heaven" and "Nunquam libertas gratior extat" (Latin for 'Never does liberty appear in a more gracious form') are common de facto mottos.
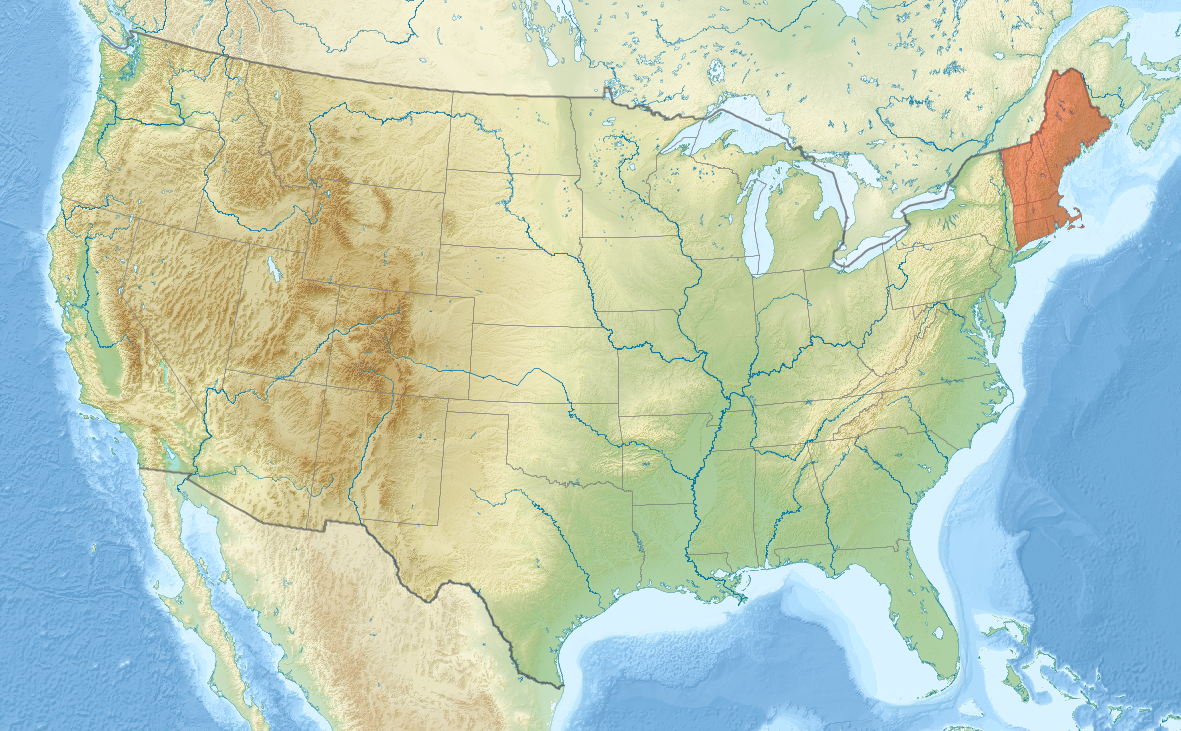
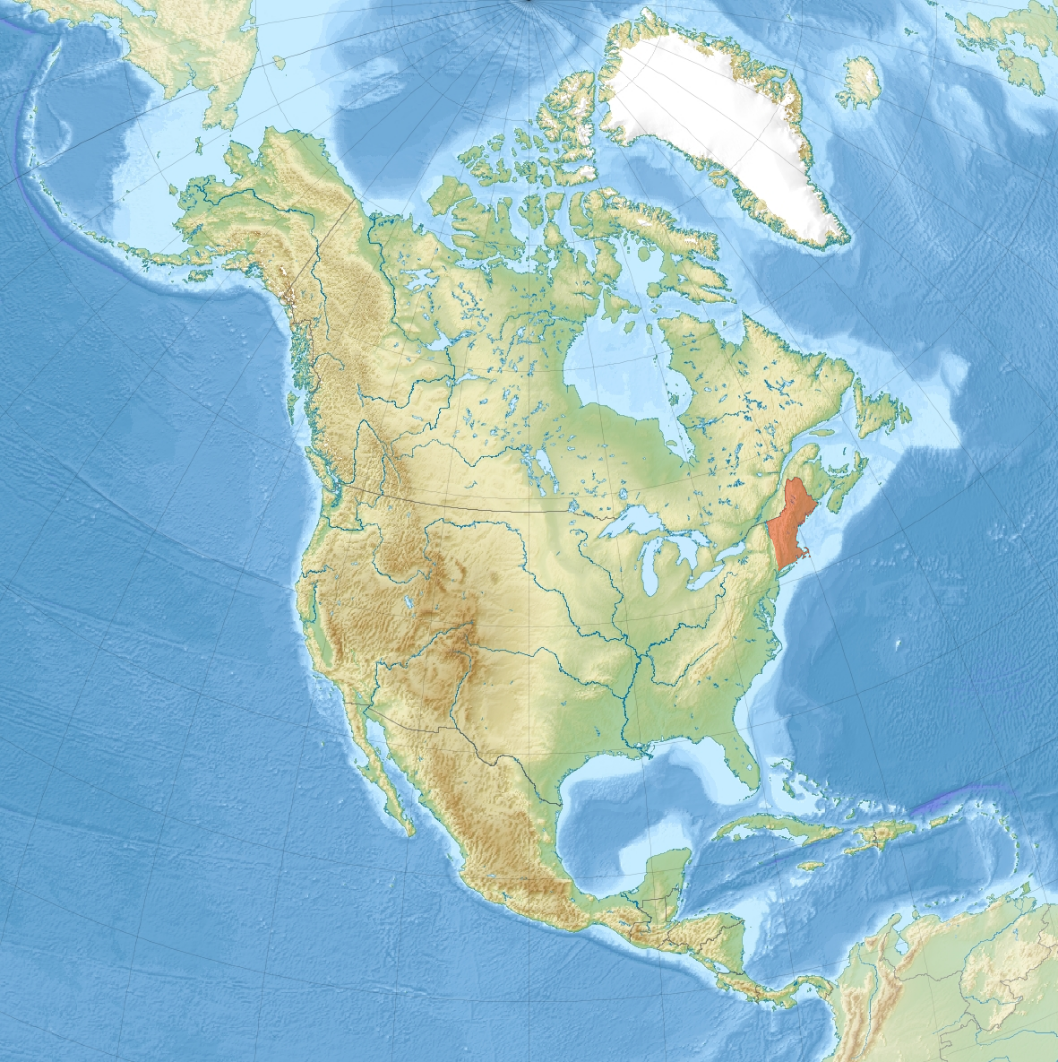
- Location of New England
- Coordinates: 44°N 71°W
- Country: United States
- Composition: Connecticut; Maine; Massachusetts; New Hampshire; Rhode Island; Vermont
- Largest metropolitan area: Greater Boston
- Largest city: Boston

Area
  - Total: 71,987.59 sq mi (186,447.0 km^{2})
  - Land: 62,688.4 sq mi (162,362 km^{2})

Population (2026)
  - Total: 15,431,980
  - Density: 246.170/sq mi (95.0466/km^{2})
- Demonym(s): New Englander, Yankee, Novanglian, Novanglican (archaic)

GDP
  - Total: $1.49 trillion (2024)
- Dialects: New England English, New England French

New England is a region consisting of six states in the Northeastern United States: Connecticut, Maine, Massachusetts, New Hampshire, Rhode Island, and Vermont. It is bordered by the state of New York to the west and by the Canadian provinces of New Brunswick to the northeast and Quebec to the north. The Gulf of Maine and Atlantic Ocean are to the east and southeast, and Long Island Sound is to the southwest. Boston is New England's largest city and the capital of Massachusetts. Greater Boston, comprising the Boston–Worcester–Providence Combined Statistical Area, houses more than half of the region's total population. The Greater Boston area includes Worcester, Massachusetts, the second-largest city in New England; Manchester, New Hampshire, the largest city in New Hampshire; and Providence, Rhode Island, the capital of and largest city in Rhode Island. In 1620, the Pilgrims established Plymouth Colony, the second successful settlement in British America after the Jamestown Settlement in Virginia, founded in 1607. Ten years later, Puritans established Massachusetts Bay Colony north of Plymouth Colony. Over the next 126 years, people in the region fought in four French and Indian Wars until the English colonists and their Haudenosaunee allies defeated the French and their Algonquian allies.

In the late 18th century, political leaders from the New England colonies initiated resistance to Great Britain's monarchist enforced taxes without the consent of the British American colonists. Residents of Rhode Island captured and burned a British Royal Navy ship which was enforcing unpopular trade restrictions, and residents of Boston threw British tea into the harbor. Britain responded with a series of punitive laws stripping Massachusetts of self-government which the colonists called the "Intolerable Acts". These confrontations led to the first battles of the American Revolutionary War in 1775 and the expulsion of the British authorities from the region in spring 1776. The region played a prominent role in the movement to abolish slavery in the United States, and it was the first region of the U.S. transformed by the Industrial Revolution, initially centered on the Blackstone and Merrimack river valleys.

The physical geography of New England is diverse. Southeastern New England is covered by a narrow coastal plain, while the western and northern regions are dominated by the rolling hills and worn-down peaks of the northern end of the Appalachian Mountains. The Atlantic fall line lies close to the coast, which enabled numerous cities to take advantage of water power along the many rivers, such as the Connecticut River, which bisects the region from north to south.

Each state is generally subdivided into small municipalities known as towns, many of which are governed by town meetings. Unincorporated areas exist only in portions of Maine, New Hampshire, and Vermont, and village-style governments common in other areas are limited to Vermont and Connecticut. New England is one of the U.S. Census Bureau's nine regional divisions and the only multi-state region with clear and consistent boundaries. It maintains a strong sense of cultural identity, although the terms of this identity are often contrasted, combining Puritanism with liberalism, agrarian life with industry, and isolation with immigration.

== History ==
=== Pre-Columbian ===
Humans reached the current-day New England region by at least 10,500 years ago and likely earlier, occupying a recently de-glaciated environment. Pre-contact Native American groups in New England did not have market economies and physical artifacts tended to change very slowly. However, technological shifts brought agriculture and ceramics to the region prior to the arrival of European settlers in the 17th century.

=== Algonquian ===
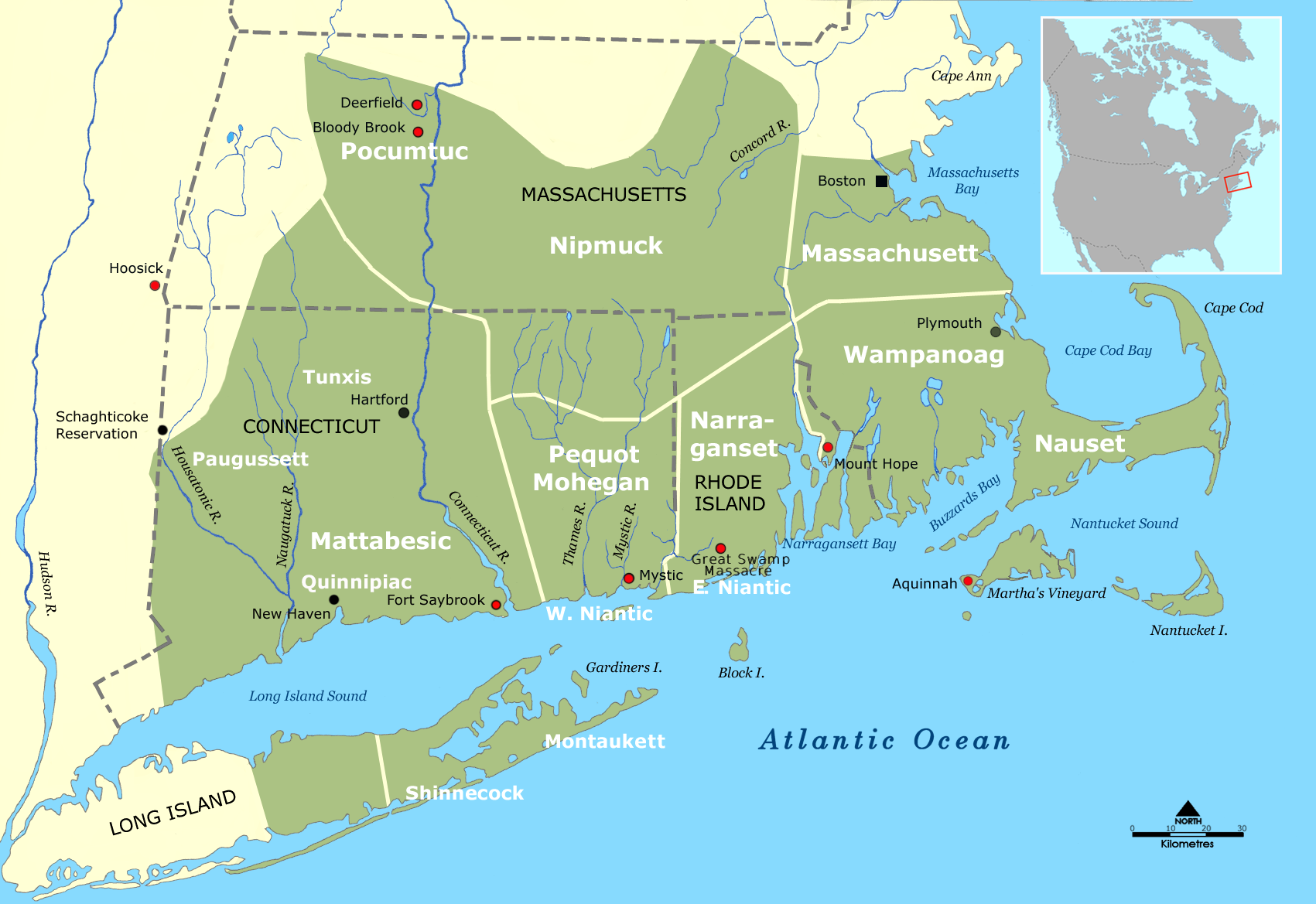
Indigenous territories, circa 1600 in present-day southern New England

The communities inhabiting the territory in the period of European colonization spoke a variety of the Eastern Algonquian languages. Prominent tribes included the Abenakis, Mi'kmaq, Penobscot, Pequots, Mohegans, Narragansetts, Nipmucs, Pocumtucks, and Wampanoags. Prior to the arrival of European colonists, the Western Abenakis inhabited what is now New Hampshire, New York, and Vermont, as well as parts of Quebec and western Maine. Their principal town was Norridgewock in today's Maine.

The Penobscots lived along the Penobscot River in Maine. The Narragansetts and smaller tribes under their sovereignty lived in Rhode Island, west of Narragansett Bay, including Block Island. The Wampanoags occupied southeastern Massachusetts, Rhode Island, and the islands of Martha's Vineyard and Nantucket. The Pocumtucks lived in Western Massachusetts, and the Mohegan and Pequot tribes lived in Connecticut. The Connecticut River Valley linked numerous tribes culturally, linguistically, and politically.

As early as 1600 CE, French, Dutch, and English traders began exploring the New World, trading metal, glass, and cloth for local beaver pelts. Many Indigenous communities are still present in modern-day New England and remain within traditional territorial boundaries, including the ten federally recognized tribes spread out across the region.

=== European Colonial period ===
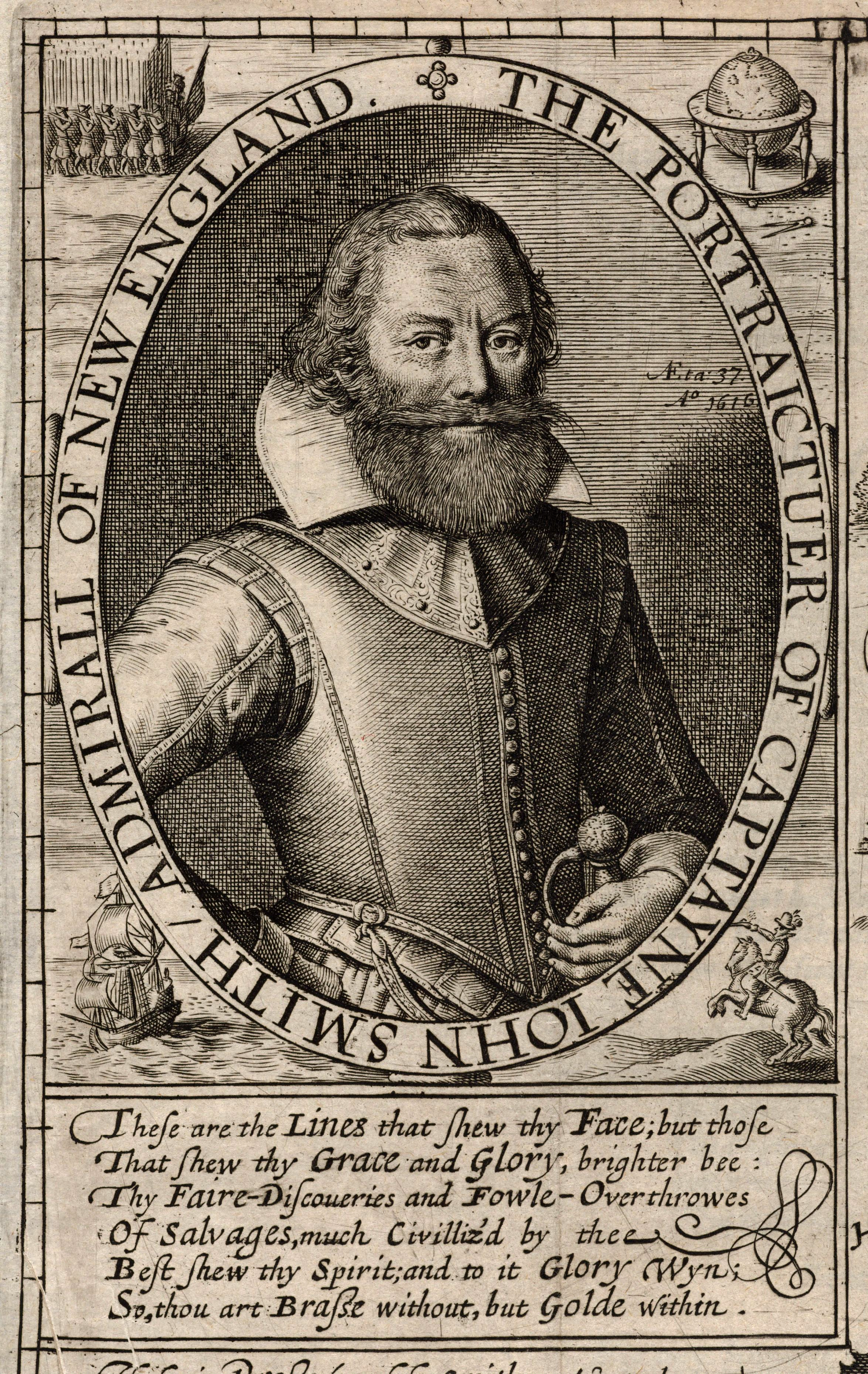
Soldier and explorer John Smith coined the name "New England" in 1616.

On April 10, 1606, King James I of England issued a charter for the Virginia Company, which consisted of the London Company and the Plymouth Company. These two privately funded ventures were intended to claim land for England, to conduct trade, and to return a profit. In 1620, the Pilgrims arrived on the Mayflower and established Plymouth Colony in Massachusetts, beginning the history of permanent European colonization in New England.

In 1616, English explorer John Smith named the region "New England". The name was officially sanctioned on November 3, 1620, when the charter of the Virginia Company of Plymouth was replaced by a royal charter for the Plymouth Council for New England, a joint-stock company established to colonize and govern the region. The Pilgrims wrote and signed the Mayflower Compact before leaving the ship, and it became their first governing document. The Massachusetts Bay Colony came to dominate the area and was established by royal charter in 1629 with its major town and port of Boston established in 1630.

Massachusetts Puritans started to establish themselves in Connecticut as early as 1633. Roger Williams was banished from Massachusetts for theological reasons; he led a group south where they founded Providence Plantations, which grew into the Colony of Rhode Island and Providence Plantations in 1636. At this time, Vermont was uncolonized, and the territories of New Hampshire and Maine were claimed and governed by Massachusetts. As the region grew, it received many immigrants from Europe due to its religious tolerance and economy.

=== French and Indian Wars ===
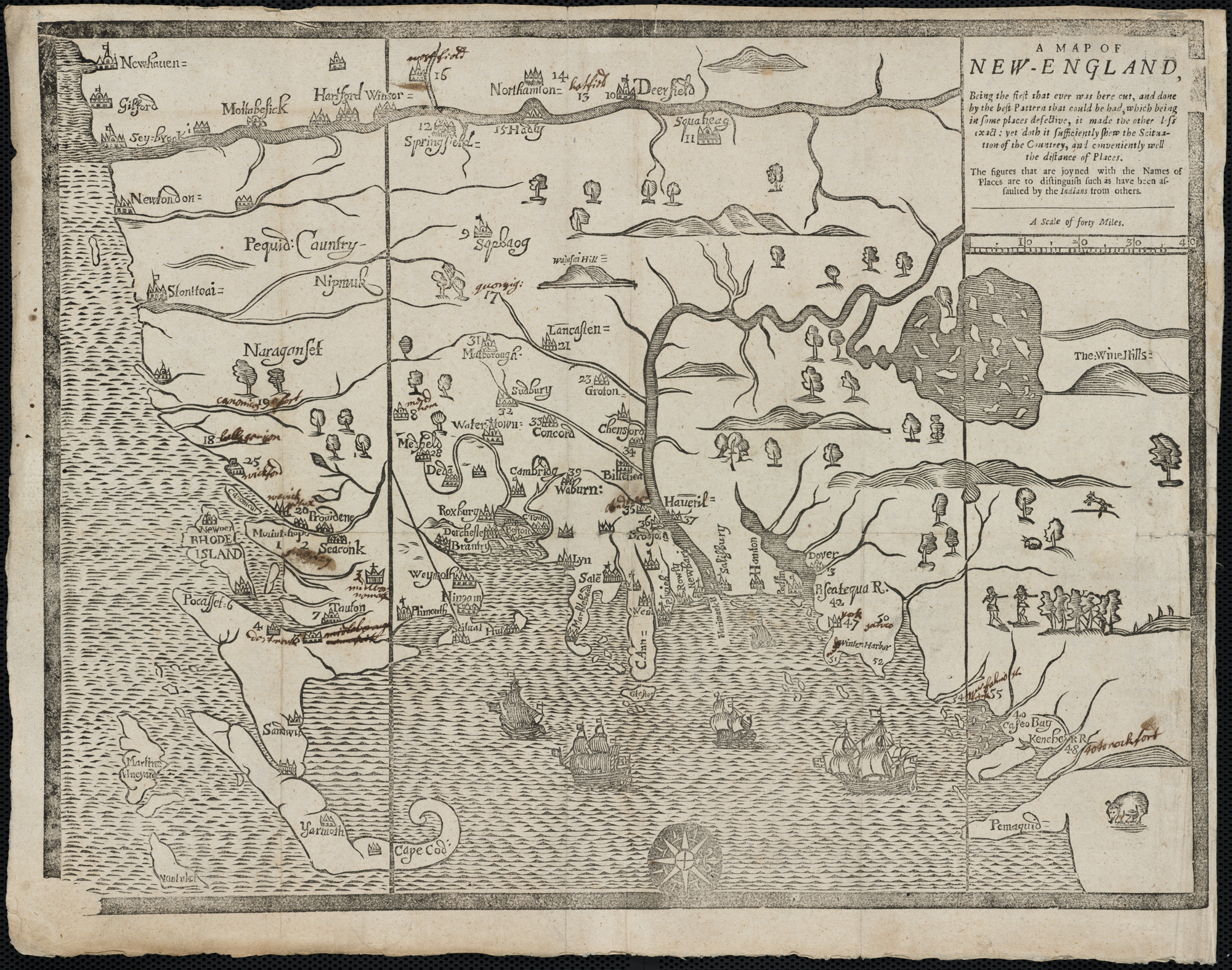
John Foster's A Map of New England, the first printed map of New England, first published in Narrative of Troubles with the Indians, Boston clergyman William Hubbard's 1677 narrative of King Philip's War (1675–78).

Relationships alternated between peace and armed skirmishes between colonists and local Native American tribes, the bloodiest of which was the Pequot War in 1637 which resulted in the Mystic massacre. On May 19, 1643, the colonies of Massachusetts Bay, Plymouth, New Haven, and Connecticut joined in a loose compact called the New England Confederation (officially "The United Colonies of New England"). The confederation was designed largely to coordinate mutual defense, and it gained some importance during King Philip's War which pitted the colonists and their Indian allies against a widespread Indian uprising from June 1675 through April 1678, resulting in killings and massacres on both sides. In the aftermath of settler-Native conflicts, hundreds of captive Indians were sold into slavery. Up until 1700, Native Americans comprised a majority of the non-white labor force in colonial New England.

During the next 74 years, there were six colonial wars that took place primarily between New England and New France, during which New England was allied with the Haudenosaunee Confederacy and New France was allied with the Wabanaki Confederacy, beginning with King William's War in 1689. Mainland Nova Scotia came under the control of New England after the Siege of Port Royal (1710), but both New Brunswick and most of Maine remained contested territory between New England and New France. The British eventually defeated the French in 1763, opening the Connecticut River Valley for British settlement into western New Hampshire and Vermont.

The New England Colonies were settled primarily by farmers who became relatively self-sufficient. Later, New England's economy began to focus on crafts and trade, aided by the Puritan work ethic, in contrast to the Southern colonies which focused on agricultural production while importing finished goods from England.

=== Dominion of New England ===
The New England Ensign, one of several flags historically associated with New England. This flag was reportedly used by colonial merchant ships sailing out of New England ports, 1686 – c. 1737.

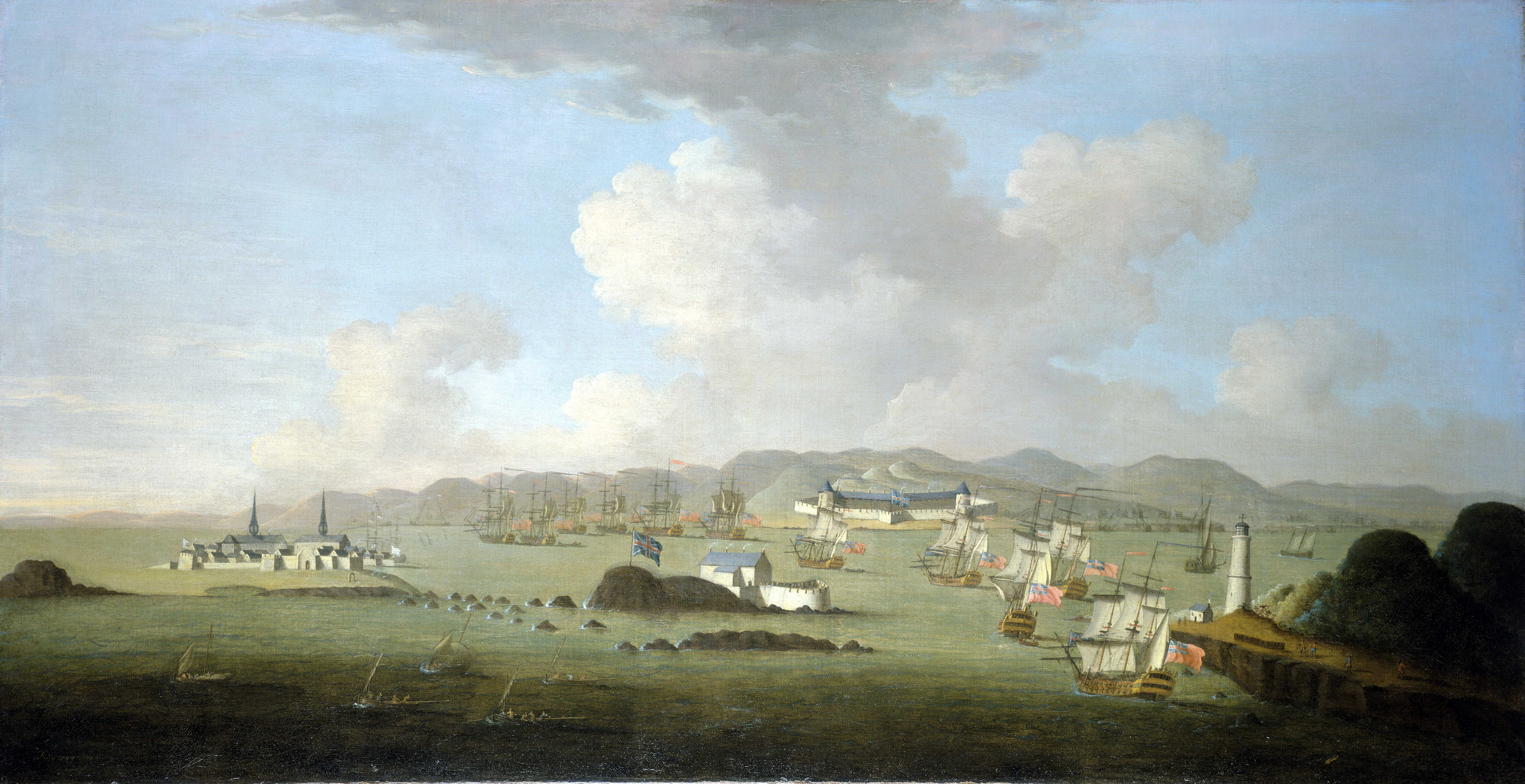
New England's Siege of Louisbourg (1745) by Peter Monamy

By 1686, King James II had become concerned about the increasingly independent ways of the colonies, including their self-governing charters, their open flouting of the Navigation Acts, and their growing military power. He therefore established the Dominion of New England, an administrative union including all of the New England colonies. In 1688, the former Dutch colonies of New York, East New Jersey, and West New Jersey were added to the dominion. The union was imposed from the outside and contrary to the rooted democratic tradition of the colonies, and it was highly unpopular among the colonists.

The dominion significantly modified the charters of the colonies, including the appointment of royal governors to nearly all of them. There was an uneasy tension among the royal governors, their officers, and the elected governing bodies of the colonies. The governors wanted unlimited authority, and the different layers of locally elected officials would often resist them. In most cases, the local town governments continued operating as self-governing bodies, just as they had before the appointment of the governors.

After the Glorious Revolution, in 1689, Bostonians overthrew the royal governor, Sir Edmund Andros. During a popular and bloodless uprising, they seized dominion officials and adherents to the Church of England. These tensions eventually culminated in the American Revolution, boiling over with the outbreak of the War of American Independence in 1775. The first battles of which were fought in Lexington and Concord, Massachusetts, leading to the Siege of Boston by continental troops. In March 1776, British forces were compelled to retreat from Boston.

=== New England in the new United States ===
After the dissolution of the Dominion of New England, the colonies of New England ceased to function as a unified political unit but remained a defined cultural region. There were often disputes over territorial jurisdiction, leading to land exchanges such as those regarding the Equivalent Lands and New Hampshire Grants.

By 1784, all of the states in the region had taken steps towards the abolition of slavery, with Vermont and Massachusetts introducing total abolition in 1777 and 1783, respectively. The nickname "Yankeeland" was sometimes used to denote the New England area, especially among Southerners and the British.

Vermont was admitted to statehood in 1791 after settling a dispute with New York. The territory of Maine had been a part of Massachusetts, but it was granted statehood on March 15, 1820, as part of the Missouri Compromise. Today, New England is defined as the six states of Maine, Vermont, New Hampshire, Massachusetts, Rhode Island, and Connecticut.

New England's economic growth relied heavily on trade with the British Empire, and the region's merchants and politicians strongly opposed trade restrictions. As the United States and the United Kingdom fought the War of 1812, New England Federalists organized the Hartford Convention in the winter of 1814 to discuss the region's grievances concerning the war, and to propose changes to the United States Constitution to protect the region's interests and maintain its political power. Radical delegates within the convention proposed the region's secession from the United States, but they were outnumbered by moderates who opposed the idea.

Politically, the region often disagreed with the rest of the country. Massachusetts and Connecticut were among the last refuges of the Federalist Party, and New England became the strongest bastion of the new Whig Party when the Second Party System began in the 1830s. The Whigs were usually dominant throughout New England, except in the more Democratic Maine and New Hampshire.

=== Industrial Revolution ===
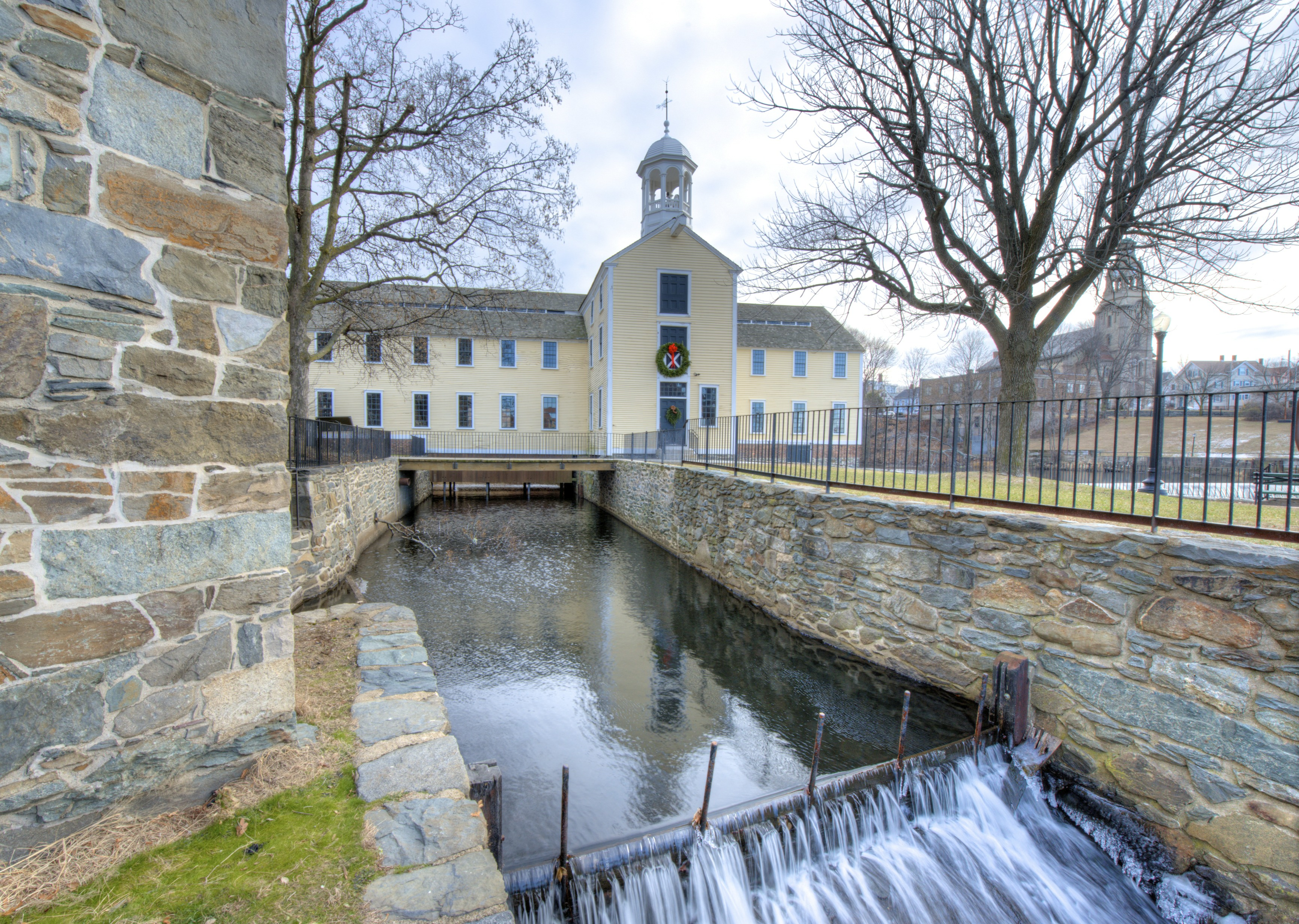
The Slater Mill Historic Site in Pawtucket, Rhode Island

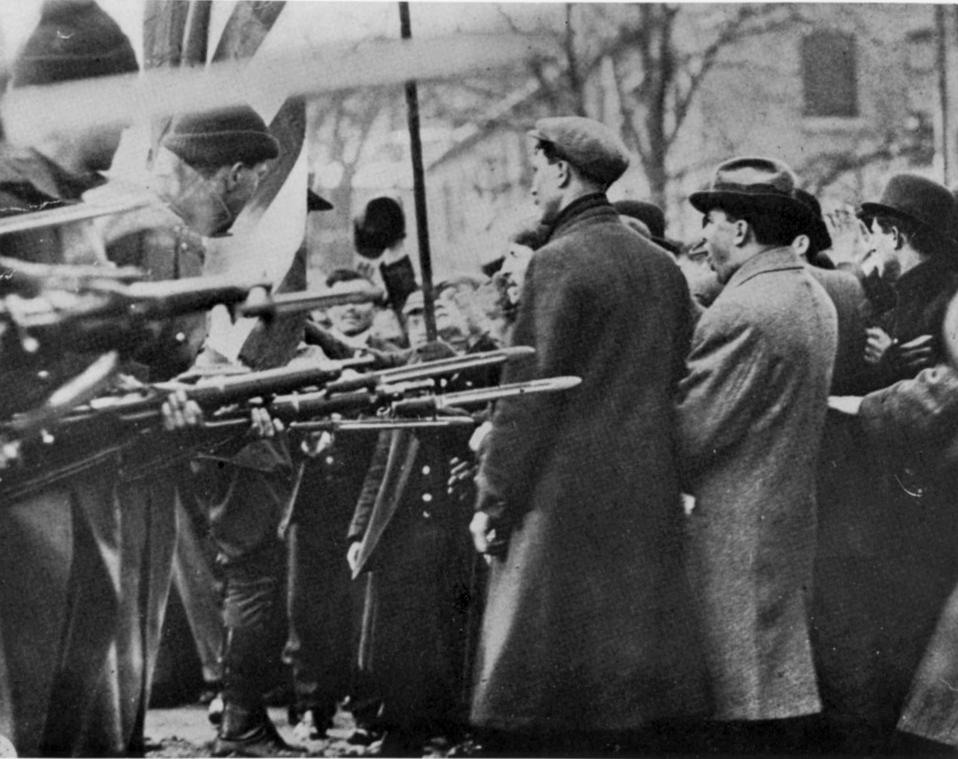
Bread and Roses Strike. Massachusetts National Guard troops surround unarmed strikers in Lawrence, Massachusetts, 1912.

New England was key to the Industrial Revolution in the United States. The Blackstone Valley running through Massachusetts and Rhode Island has been called the birthplace of America's industrial revolution. In 1787, the first cotton mill in America was founded in the North Shore seaport of Beverly, Massachusetts as the Beverly Cotton Manufactory. The Manufactory was also considered the largest cotton mill of its time. Technological developments and achievements from the Manufactory led to the development of more advanced cotton mills, including Slater Mill in Pawtucket, Rhode Island. Towns such as Lawrence, Massachusetts, Lowell, Massachusetts, Woonsocket, Rhode Island, and Lewiston, Maine became centers of the textile industry following the innovations at Slater Mill and the Beverly Cotton Manufactory.

The Connecticut River Valley became a crucible for industrial innovation, particularly the Springfield Armory, pioneering such advances as interchangeable parts and the assembly line which influenced manufacturing processes all around the world. From early in the nineteenth century until the mid-twentieth, the region surrounding Springfield, Massachusetts and Hartford, Connecticut served as the United States' epicenter for advanced manufacturing, drawing skilled workers from all over the world.

The rapid growth of textile manufacturing in New England between 1815 and 1860 caused a shortage of workers. Recruiters were hired by mill agents to bring young women and children from the countryside to work in the factories. Between 1830 and 1860, thousands of farm girls moved from rural areas where there was no paid employment to work in the nearby mills, such as the Lowell Mill Girls. As the textile industry grew, immigration also grew. By the 1850s, immigrants began working in the mills, especially French Canadians and Irish.

New England as a whole was the most industrialized part of the United States. By 1850, the region accounted for well over a quarter of all manufacturing value in the country and over a third of its industrial workforce. It was also the most literate and most educated region in the country.

=== Political and demographic shift ===
During the same period, New England and areas settled by New Englanders (upstate New York, Ohio's Western Reserve, and the upper midwestern states of Michigan and Wisconsin) were the center of the strongest abolitionist and anti-slavery movements in the United States, coinciding with the Protestant Great Awakening in the region. Abolitionists who demanded immediate emancipation had their base in the region, such as William Lloyd Garrison, John Greenleaf Whittier, and Wendell Phillips. So too did anti-slavery politicians who wanted to limit the growth of slavery, such as John Quincy Adams, Charles Sumner, and John P. Hale. The anti-slavery Republican Party was formed in the 1850s, and all of New England became strongly Republican, including areas that had previously been strongholds for both the Whig and the Democratic parties. New England remained solidly Republican until Catholics began to mobilize behind the Democrats, especially in 1928. This led to the end of "Yankee Republicanism" and began New England's relatively swift transition into a consistently Democratic stronghold in national elections.

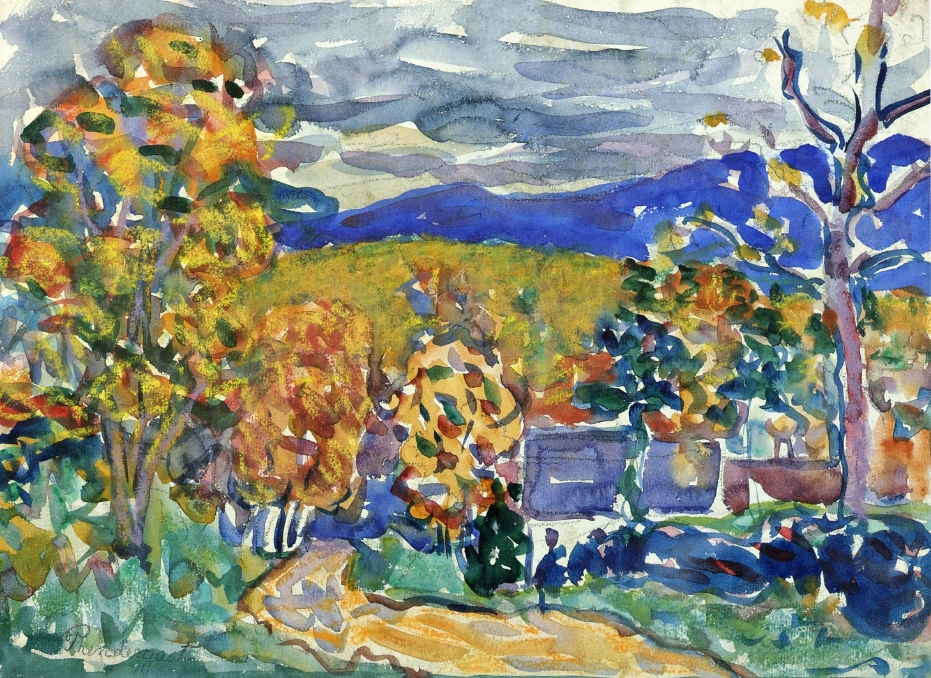
Autumn in New England, watercolor, Maurice Prendergast, c. 1910–1913

The flow of immigrants continued at a steady pace from the 1840s until cut off by World War I. The largest numbers came from Ireland and Britain before 1890, and after that from Quebec, Italy, and Southern Europe. The immigrants filled the ranks of factory workers, craftsmen, and unskilled laborers. The Irish and Italians assumed a larger and larger role in the Democratic Party in the cities and statewide, while the rural areas remained Republican.

=== The Great Depression and post-World War II changes ===
The Great Depression in the United States of the 1930s hit the region hard, with high unemployment in the industrial cities. The Boston Stock Exchange rivaled the New York Stock Exchange in 1930. The Democrats appealed to factory workers and especially Catholics, pulling them into the New Deal coalition and making the once-Republican region into one that was closely divided. However, the enormous spending on munitions, ships, electronics, and uniforms during World War II caused a burst of prosperity in every sector.

The region lost most of its factories starting with the loss of textiles in the 1930s and getting worse after 1960. The New England economy was radically transformed after World War II. The factory economy practically disappeared. Once-bustling New England communities fell into economic decay following the flight of the region's industrial base. The textile mills one by one went out of business from the 1920s to the 1970s. For example, the Crompton Company went bankrupt in 1984 after 178 years in business, costing the jobs of 2,450 workers in five states. The major reasons were cheap imports, the strong dollar, declining exports, and a failure to diversify. The shoe industry subsequently left the region as well.

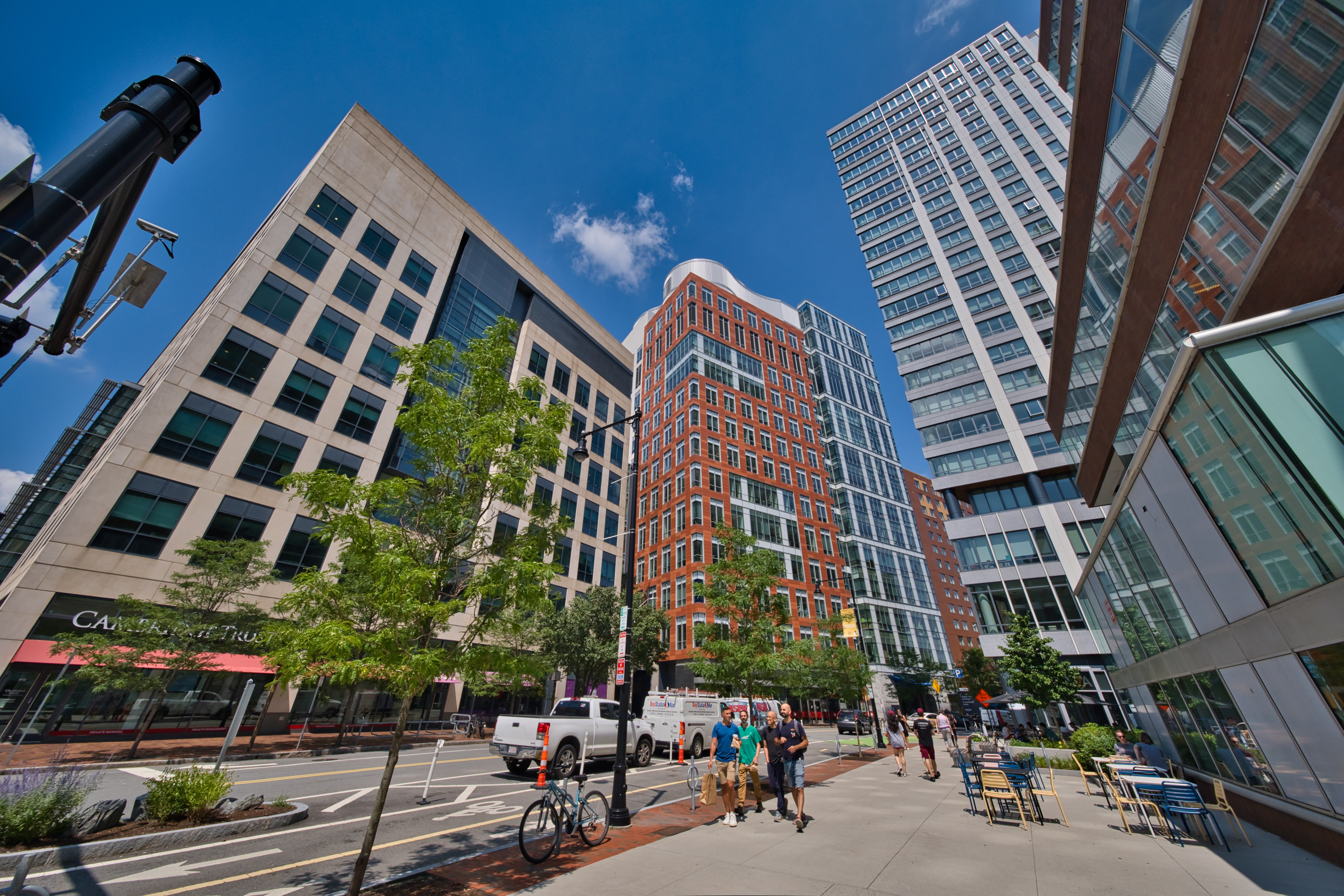
Cambridge, Massachusetts, has a high concentration of startups and technology companies.

What remains is very high technology manufacturing, such as jet engines, nuclear submarines, pharmaceuticals, robotics, scientific instruments, and medical devices. The Massachusetts Institute of Technology invented the format for university-industry relations in high tech fields and spawned many software and hardware firms, some of which grew rapidly. By the 21st century, the region had become famous for its leadership roles in the fields of education, medicine, medical research, high-technology, finance, and tourism.

Some industrial areas were slow in adjusting to the new service economy. In 2000, New England had two of the ten poorest cities in the U.S. (by percentage living below the poverty line): the state capitals of Providence, Rhode Island and Hartford, Connecticut. They were no longer in the bottom ten by 2010; Connecticut, Massachusetts, and New Hampshire remain among the ten wealthiest states in the United States in terms of median household income and per capita income.

== Geography ==
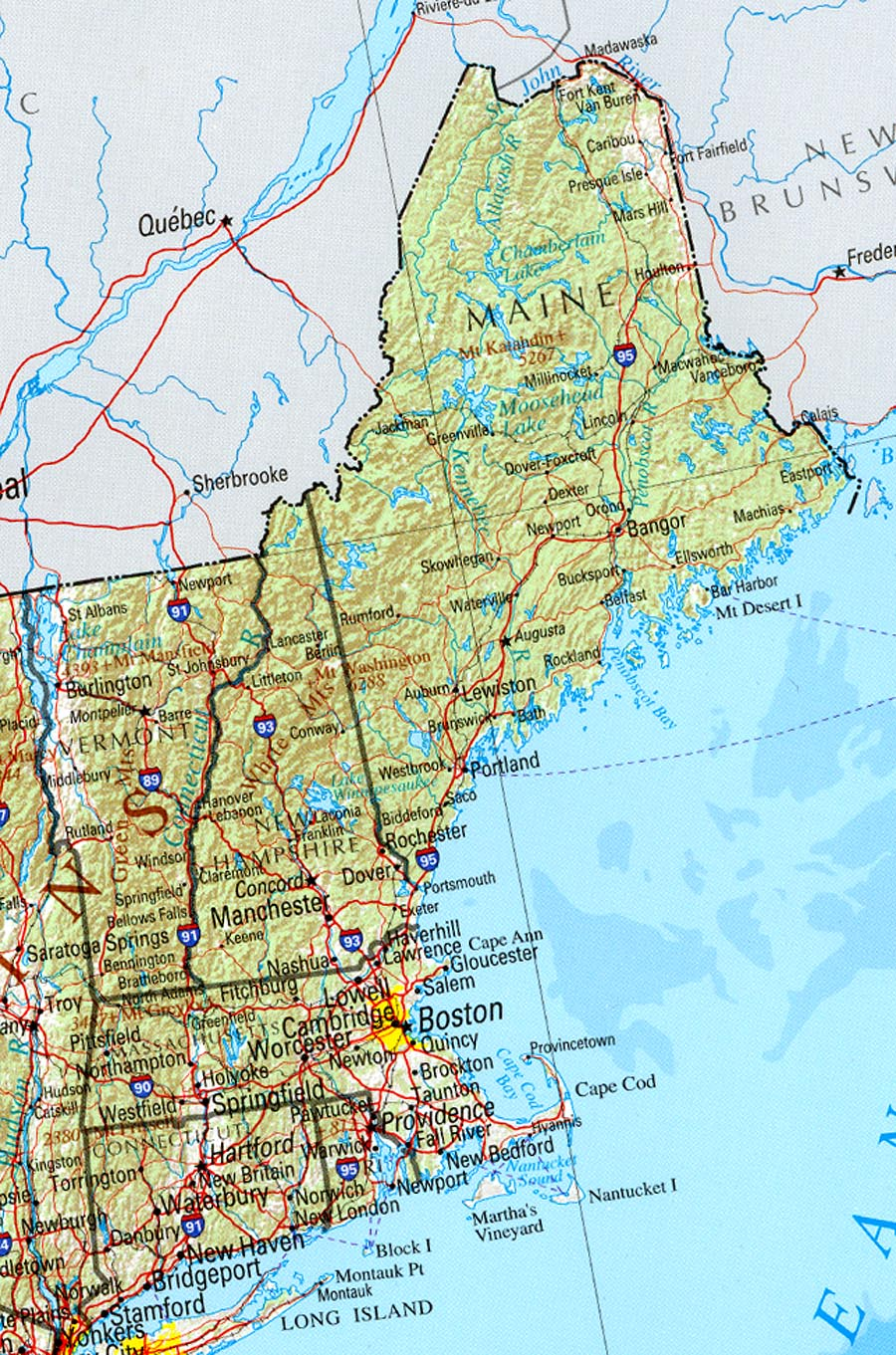
A political and geographical map of New England shows the coastal plains in the southeast, and hills, mountains and valleys in the west and the north.

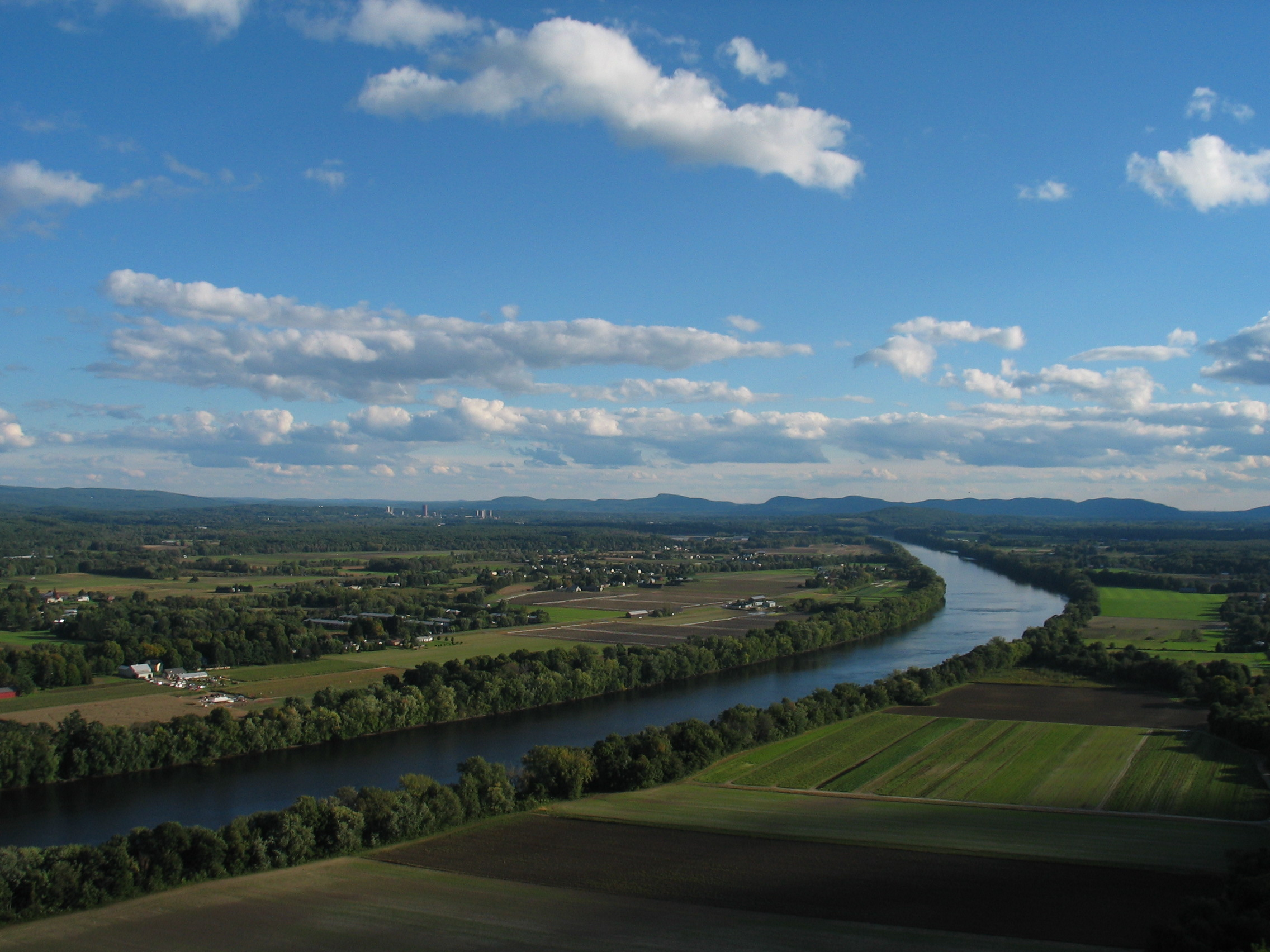
A portion of the north-central Pioneer Valley in Sunderland, Massachusetts

The states of New England have a combined area, including water surfaces, of 71,988 square miles (186,447 km^{2}), making the region slightly larger than the state of Washington and slightly smaller than Great Britain. Maine alone constitutes nearly one-half of the total area of New England, yet is only the 39th-largest state, slightly smaller than Indiana. The remaining states are among the smallest in the U.S., including the smallest state—Rhode Island.

The areas of the states (including water area) are:

- Maine, 35,380 square miles (91,600 km^{2})
- Massachusetts, 10,554 square miles (27,330 km^{2})
- Vermont, 9,616 square miles (24,910 km^{2})
- New Hampshire, 9,349 square miles (24,210 km^{2})
- Connecticut, 5,543 square miles (14,360 km^{2})
- Rhode Island, 1,545 square miles (4,000 km^{2})

=== Geology ===
New England's long rolling hills, mountains, and jagged coastline are glacial landforms resulting from the retreat of ice sheets approximately 18,000 years ago, during the last glacial period.

New England is geologically a part of the New England province, an exotic terrane region consisting of the Appalachian Mountains, the New England highlands and the seaboard lowlands. The Appalachian Mountains roughly follow the border between New England and New York. The Berkshires in Massachusetts and Connecticut, and the Green Mountains in Vermont, as well as the Taconic Mountains, form a spine of Precambrian rock.

The Appalachians extend northwards into New Hampshire as the White Mountains, and then into Maine and Canada. Mount Washington in New Hampshire is the highest peak in the Northeast, although it is not among the ten highest peaks in the eastern United States. It is the site of the second highest recorded wind speed on Earth, and has the reputation of having the world's most severe weather.

The coast of the region, extending from southwestern Connecticut to northeastern Maine, is dotted with lakes, hills, marshes and wetlands, and sandy beaches. Important valleys in the region include the Champlain Valley, the Connecticut River Valley and the Merrimack Valley. The longest river is the Connecticut River, which flows from northeastern New Hampshire for 407 mi (655 km), emptying into Long Island Sound, roughly bisecting the region. Lake Champlain, which forms part of the border between Vermont and New York, is the largest lake in the region, followed by Moosehead Lake in Maine and Lake Winnipesaukee in New Hampshire.

=== Climate ===
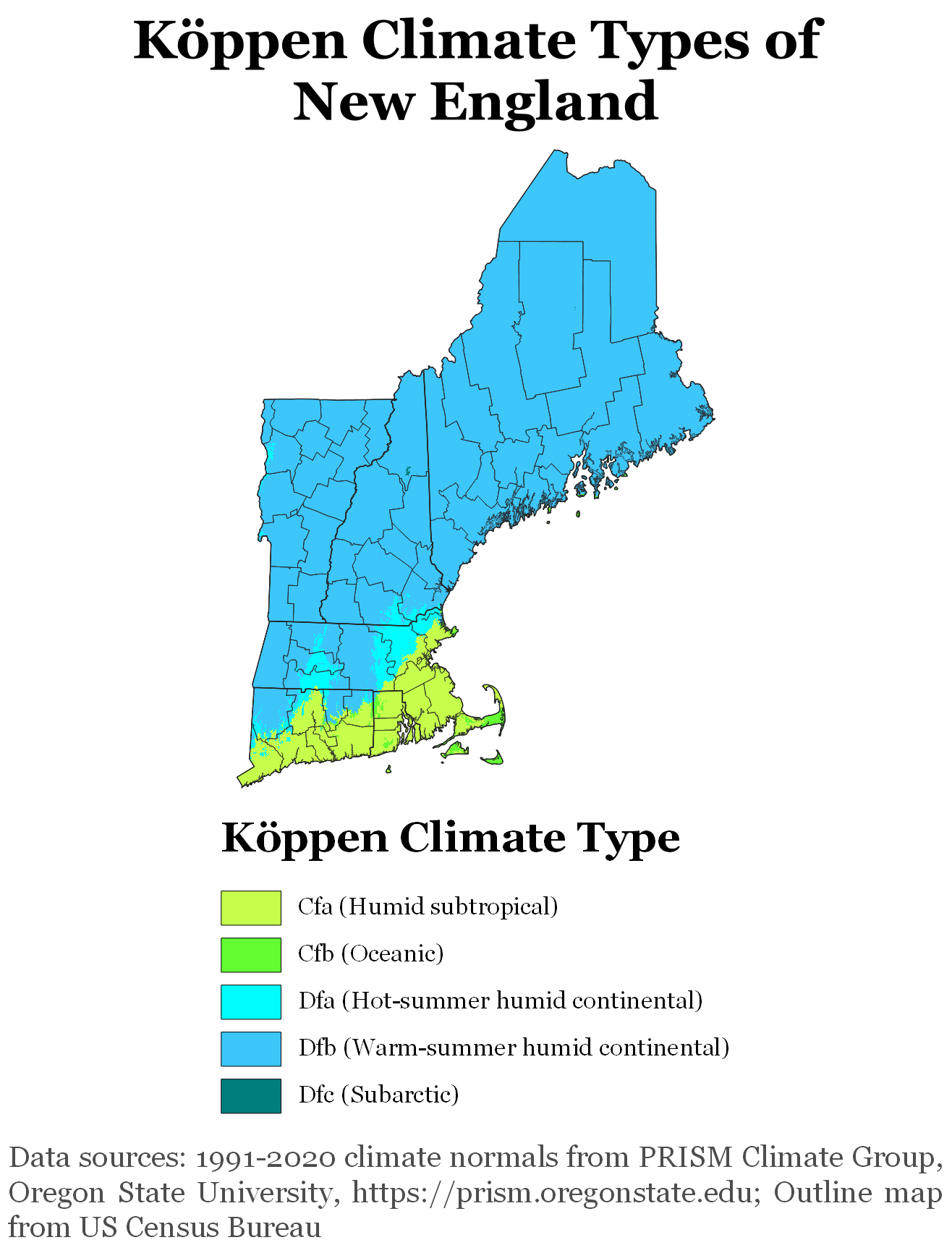
Köppen climate types in New England

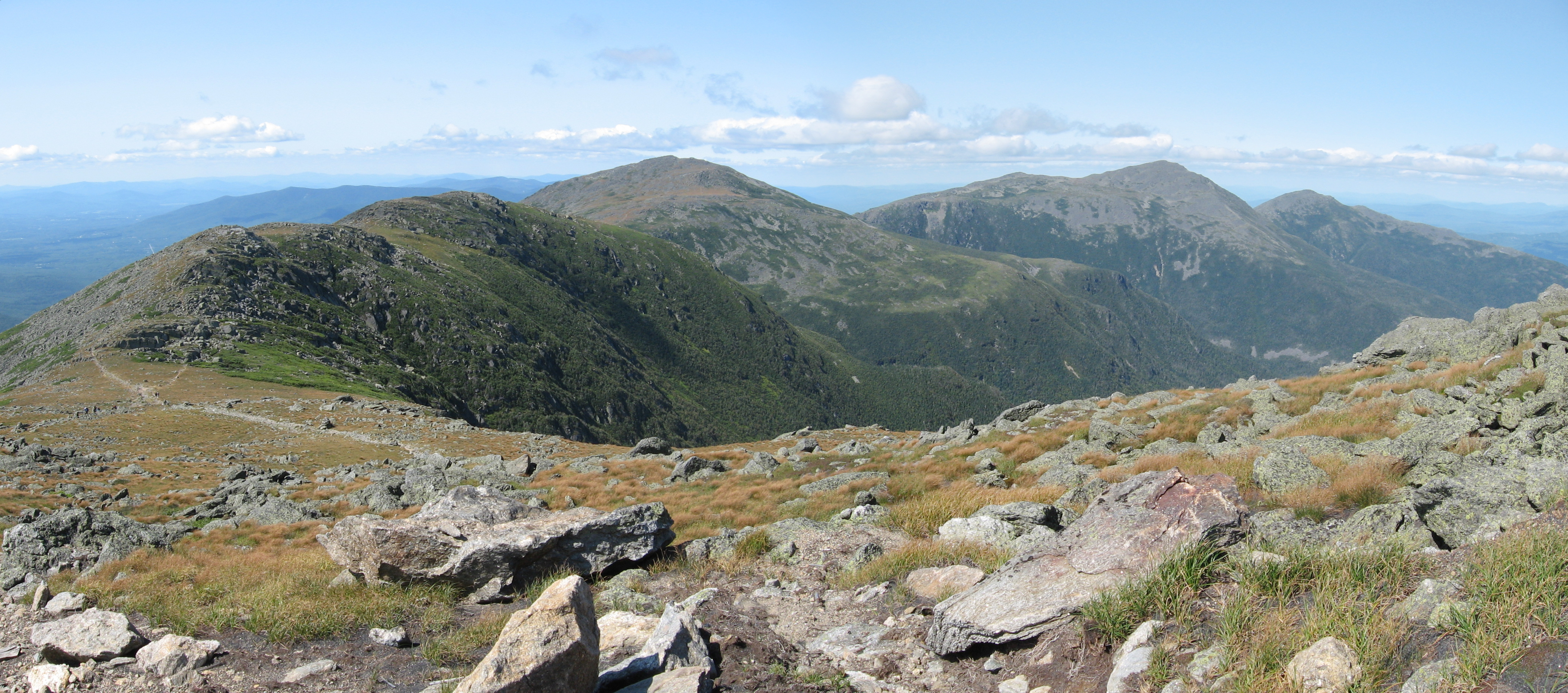
The White Mountains of New Hampshire are part of the Appalachian Mountains.

The climate of New England varies greatly across its 500 miles (800 km) span from northern Maine to southern Connecticut:

Maine, New Hampshire, Vermont, and western Massachusetts have a humid continental climate (Dfb in Köppen climate classification). In this region the winters are long and cold, and heavy snow is common (most locations receive 60–120 inches (150–300 cm) of snow annually in this region). The summer's months are moderately warm, though summer is rather short and rainfall is spread through the year.

In central and eastern Massachusetts, northern Rhode Island, and northern Connecticut, the same humid continental climate prevails (Dfa), though summers are warm to hot, winters are shorter, and there is less snowfall (especially in the coastal areas where it is often warmer).

Southern and coastal Connecticut is the broad transition zone from the cold continental climates of the north to the milder subtropical climates to the south. The frost free season is greater than 180 days across far southern/coastal Connecticut, coastal Rhode Island, and the islands (Nantucket and Martha's Vineyard). Winters also tend to be much sunnier in southern Connecticut and southern Rhode Island compared to the rest of New England.

=== Regions ===
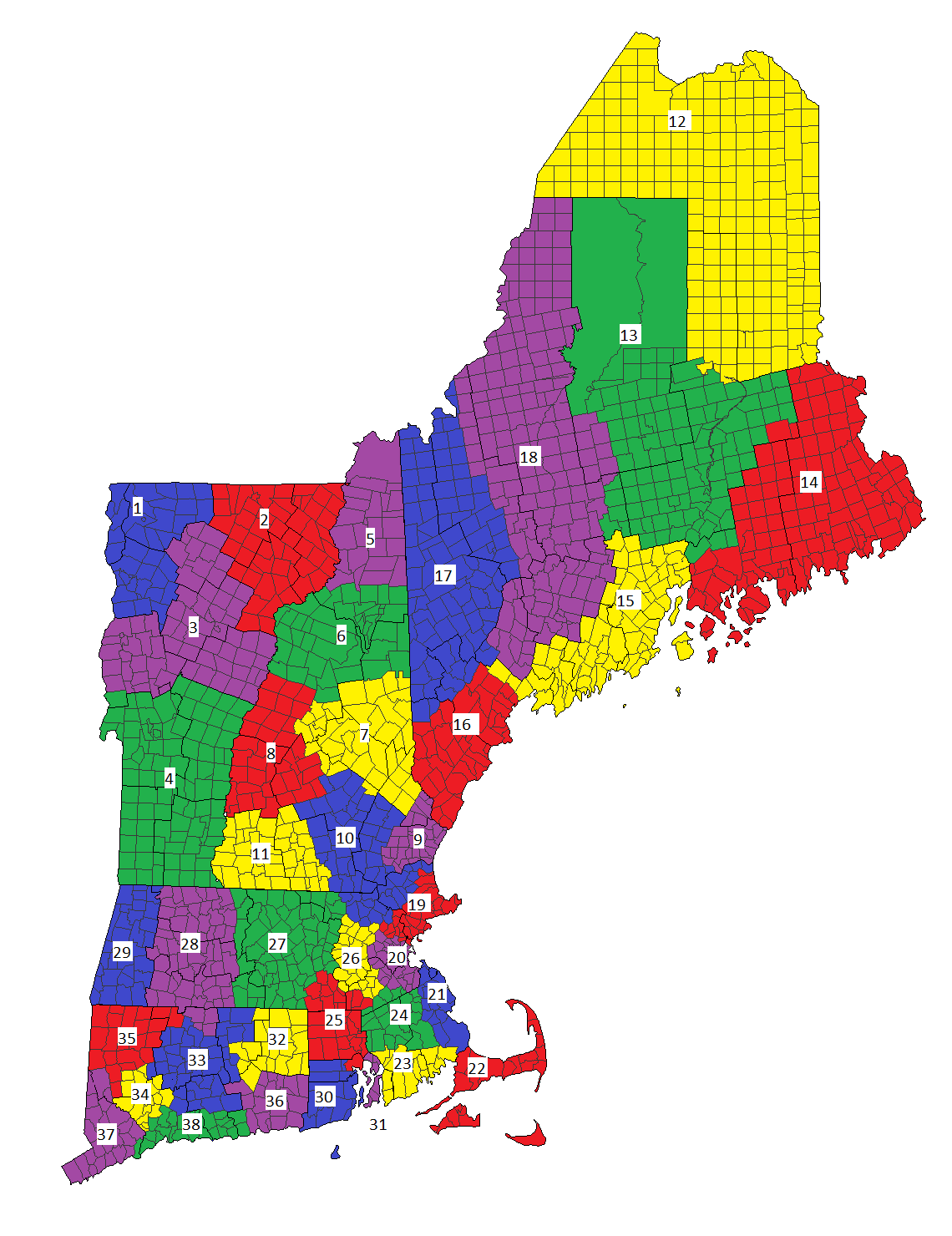

1. Northwest Vermont/Champlain Valley
2. Northeast Kingdom
3. Central Vermont
4. Southern Vermont
5. Great North Woods Region
6. White Mountains
7. Lakes Region
8. Dartmouth/Lake Sunapee Region
9. Seacoast Region
10. Merrimack Valley
11. Monadnock Region
12. Aroostook
13. Maine Highlands
14. Acadia/Down East
15. Mid-Coast/Penobscot Bay
16. Southern Maine/South Coast
17. Mountain and Lakes Region
18. Kennebec Valley
19. North Shore
20. Metro Boston
21. South Shore
22. Cape Cod and Islands
23. South Coast
24. Southeastern Massachusetts
25. Blackstone River Valley
26. Metrowest/Greater Boston
27. Central Massachusetts
28. Pioneer Valley
29. The Berkshires
30. South County
31. East Bay
32. Quiet Corner
33. Greater Hartford
34. Central Naugatuck Valley
35. Northwest Hills
36. Southeastern Connecticut/Greater New London
37. Western Connecticut
38. Connecticut Shoreline

=== Biodiversity ===
New England contains forested ecosystems with a variety of terrestrial vertebrates. Land-use patterns and land disturbance, such as the dramatic increase in land clearing for agriculture in the mid eighteenth century to nineteenth century, greatly altered the ecosystem and resulted in extinctions, local extirpations, and recolonizations.

According to an analysis of USDA Forest Service data, tree species diversity increases from north to south at about two to three species per degree in latitude. In addition, taller trees are associated with higher tree species diversity, and tree height is a better predictor than general forest age or biomass. Due to an increasing the amount of nitrogen in the soil from climate change, the red maple is becoming one of the most abundant trees in the region, and outcompeting other maples such as the sugar maple.

=== Largest cities ===
The most populous cities as of the 2020 U.S. Census were (metropolitan areas in parentheses):

1. Boston, Massachusetts: 675,647 (4,941,632)
2. Worcester, Massachusetts: 206,518 (923,672)
3. Providence, Rhode Island: 190,934 (1,604,291)
4. Springfield, Massachusetts: 155,929 (699,162)
5. Bridgeport, Connecticut: 148,654 (939,904)
6. Stamford, Connecticut: 135,470 (part of Greater Bridgeport)
7. New Haven, Connecticut: 134,023 (862,477)
8. Hartford, Connecticut: 121,054 (1,214,295)
9. Cambridge, Massachusetts: 118,403 (part of Greater Boston)
10. Manchester, New Hampshire: 115,644 (406,678)

During the 20th century, urban expansion in regions surrounding New York City has become an important economic influence on neighboring Connecticut, parts of which belong to the New York metropolitan area. The U.S. Census Bureau groups Fairfield, New Haven and Litchfield counties in western Connecticut together with New York City and other parts of New York and New Jersey as a combined statistical area.

Major cities of New England

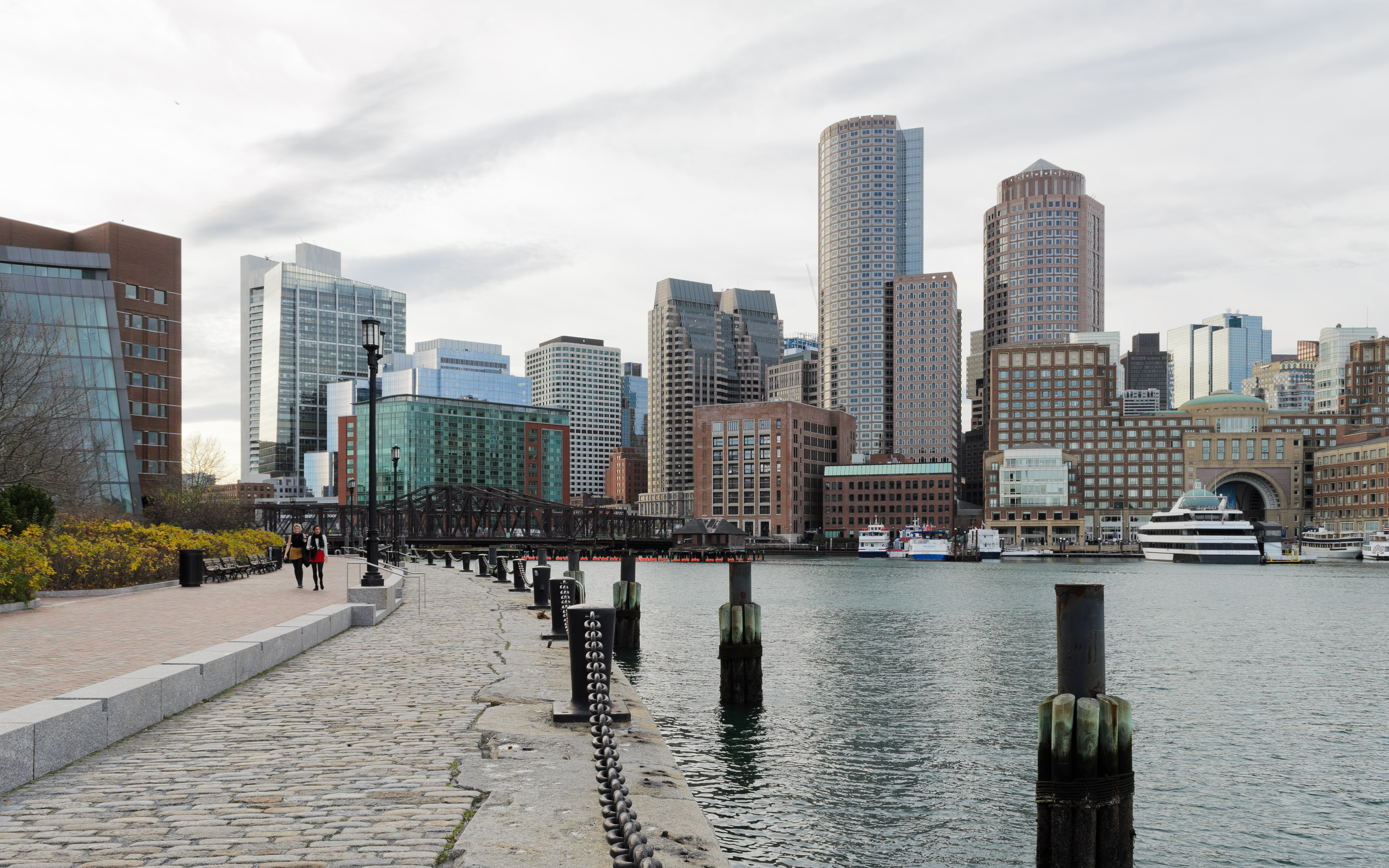
1. Boston, Massachusetts

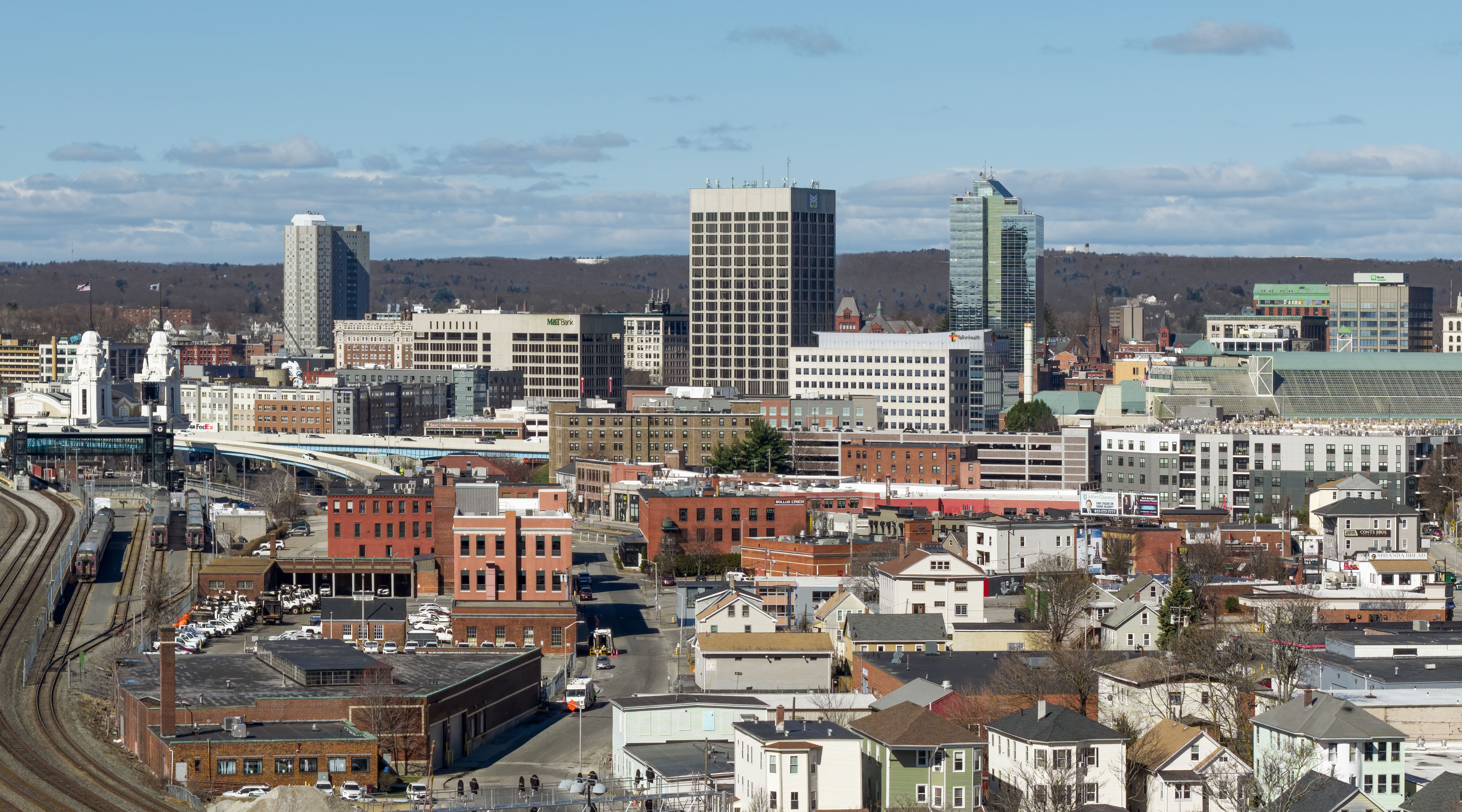
2. Worcester, Massachusetts

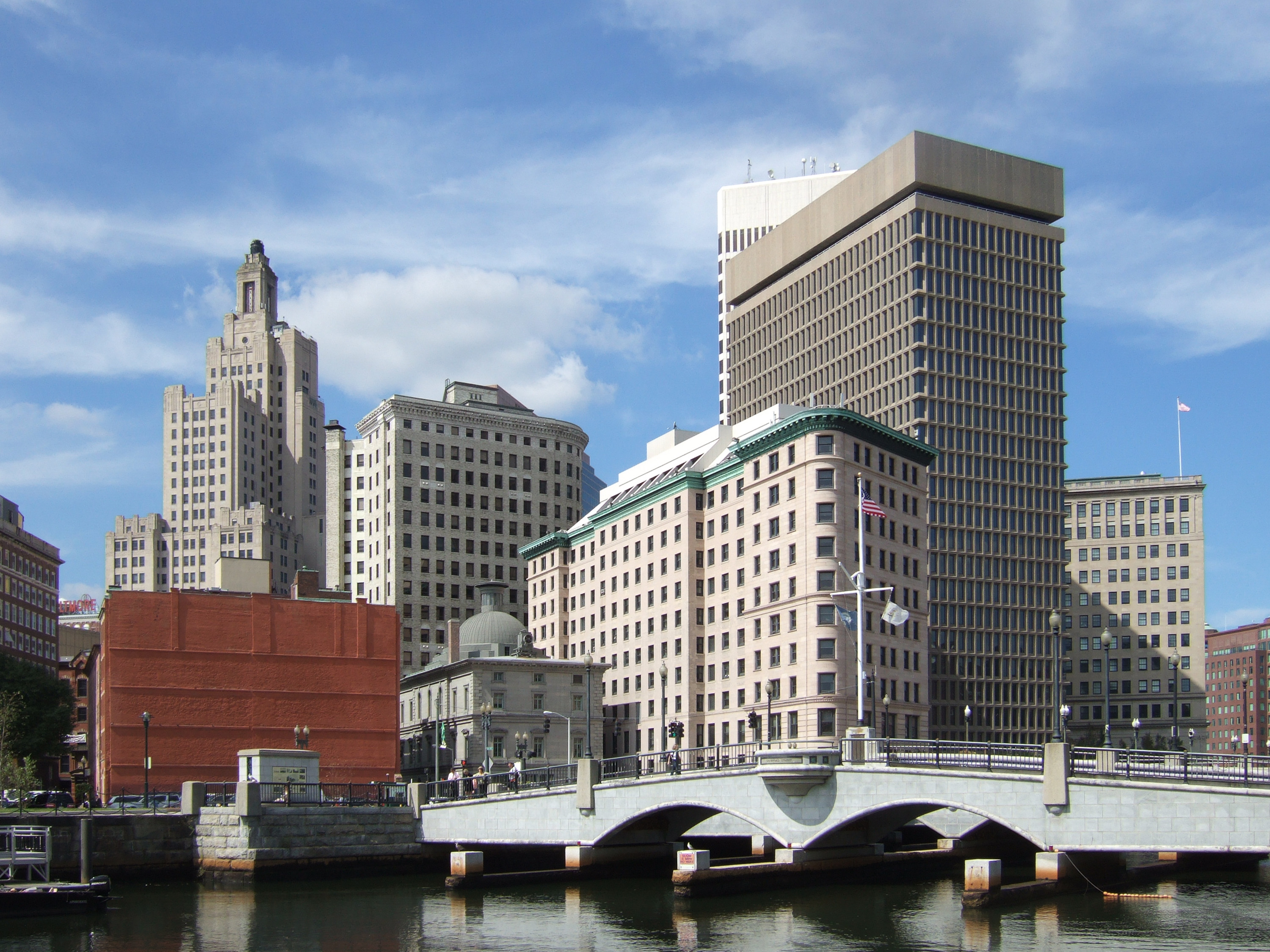
3. Providence, Rhode Island

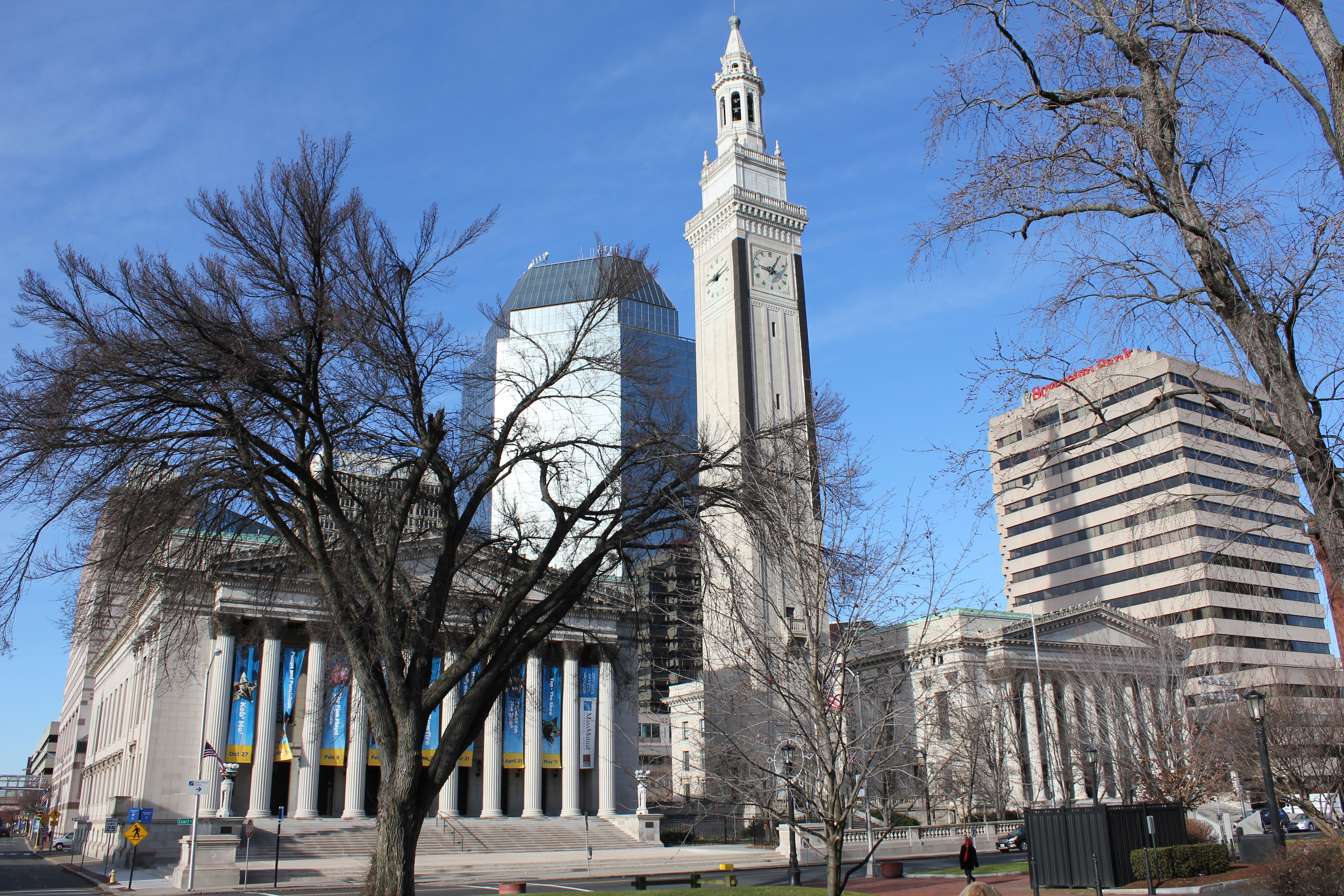
4. Springfield, Massachusetts

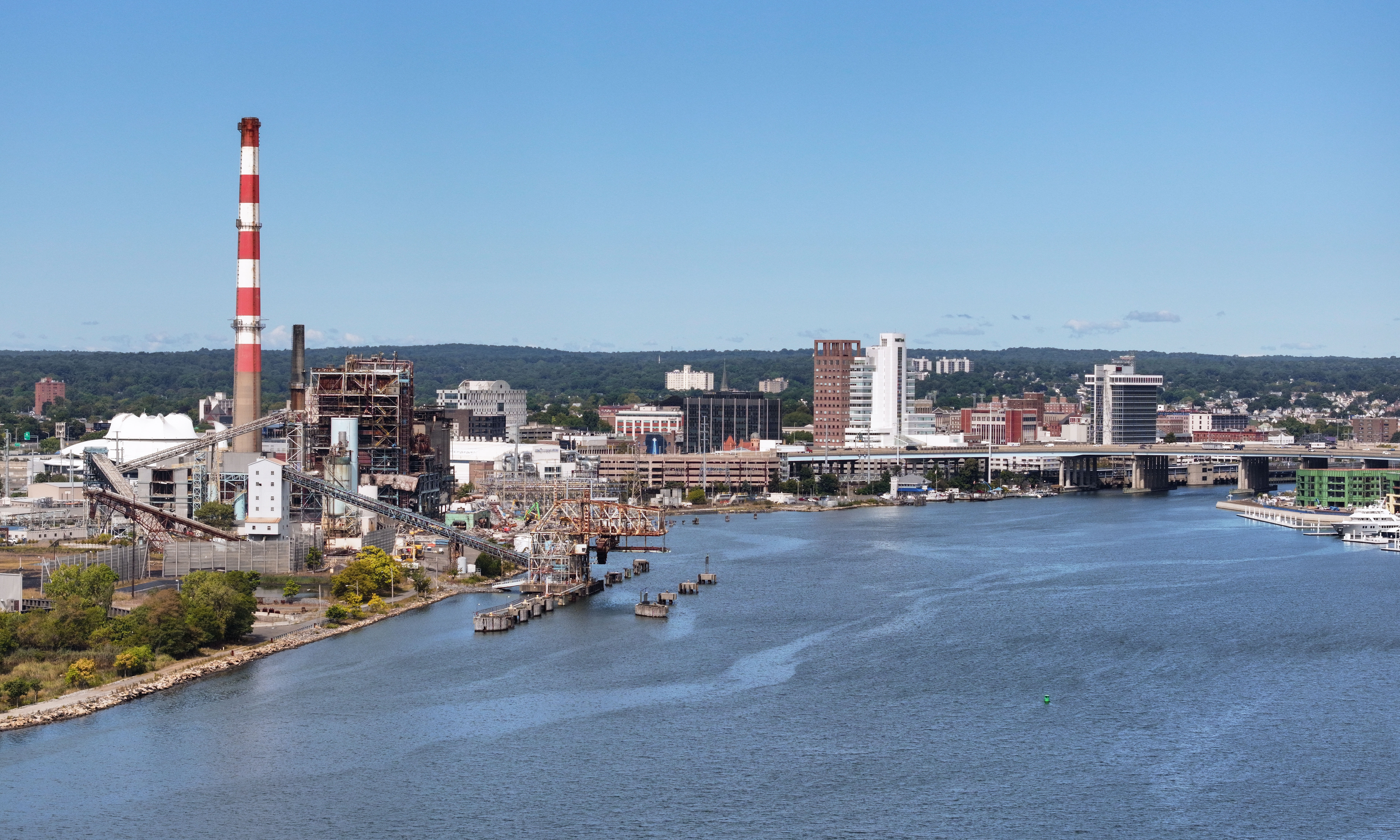
5. Bridgeport, Connecticut

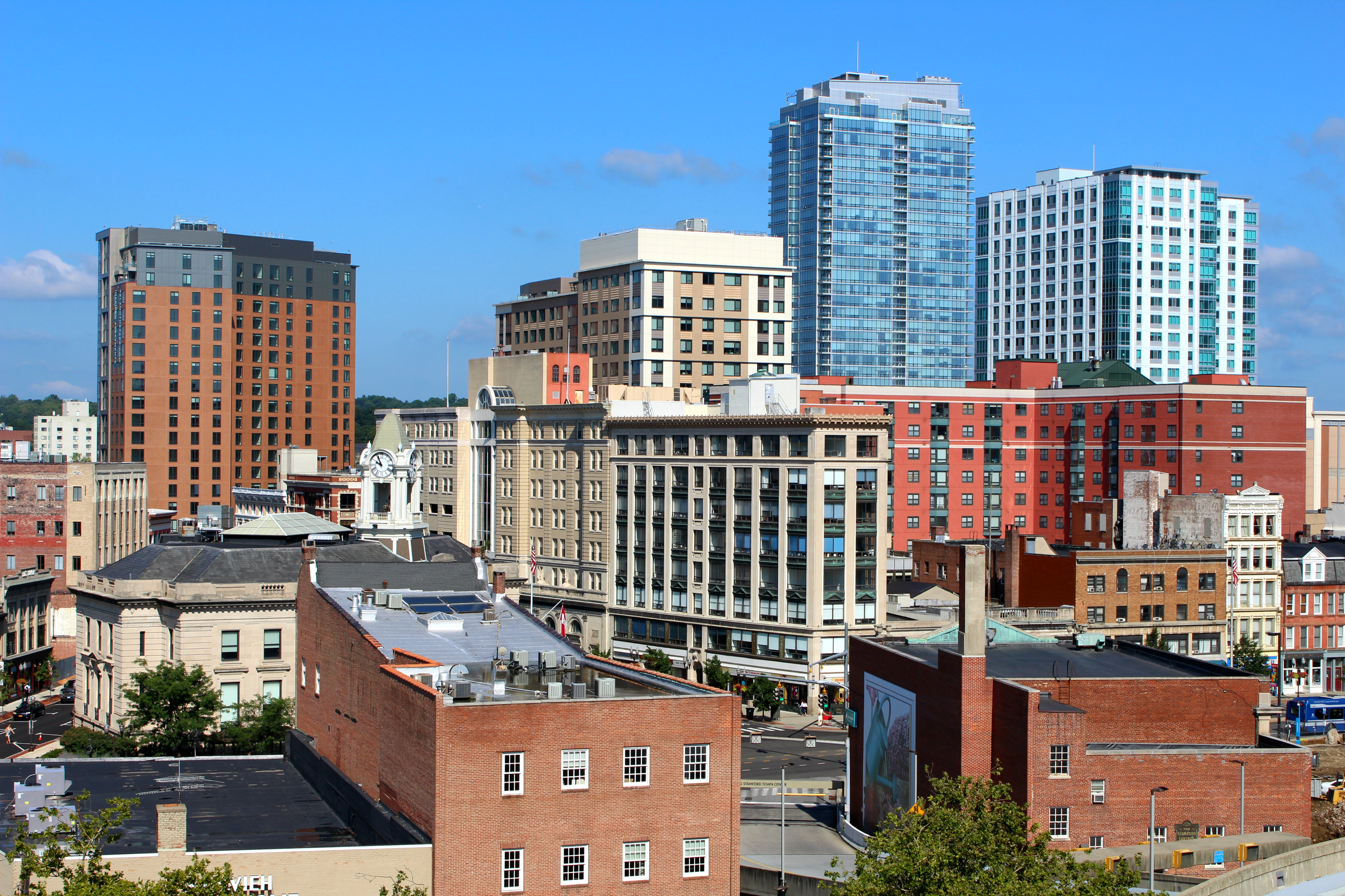
6. Stamford, Connecticut

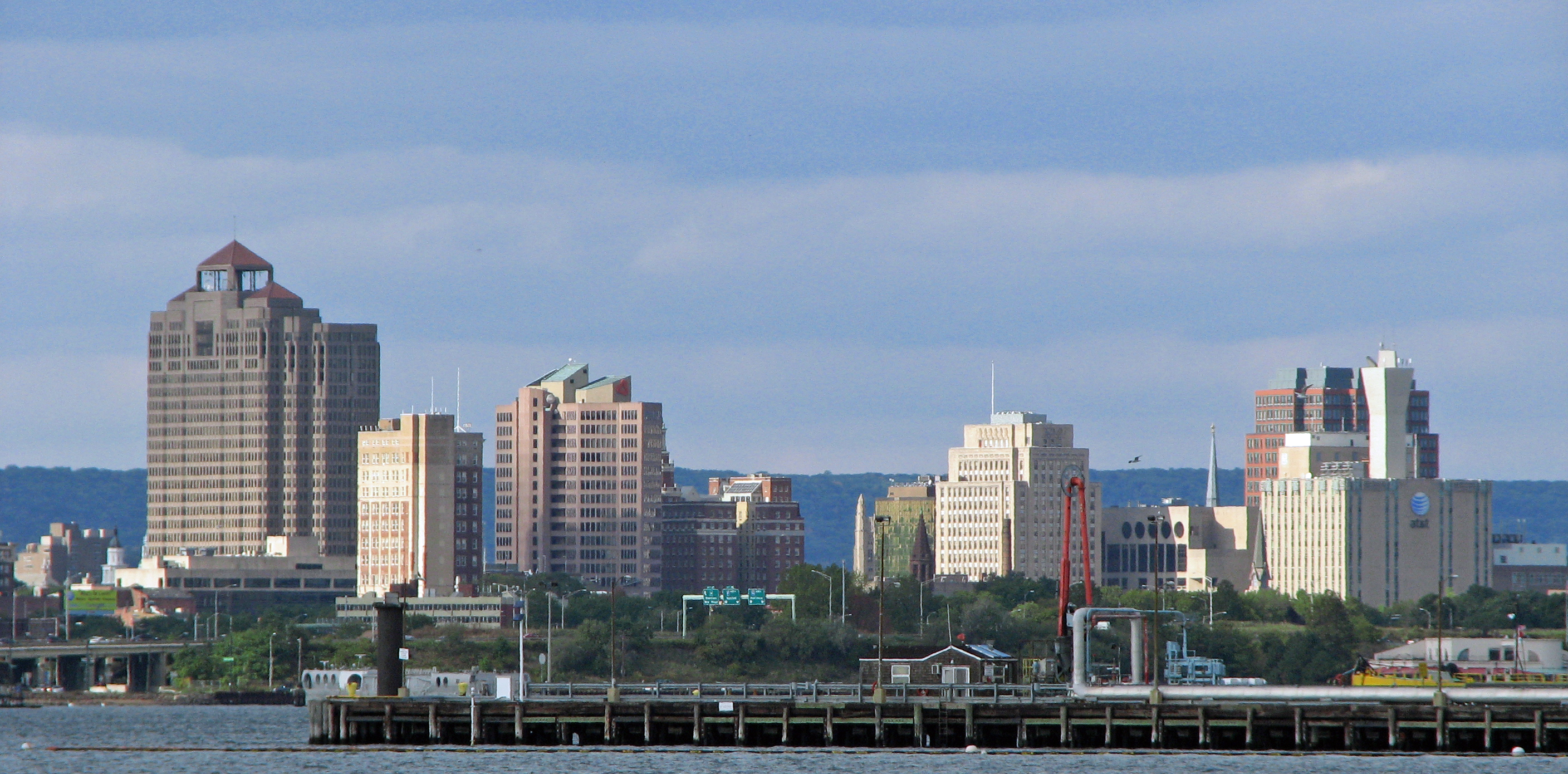
7. New Haven, Connecticut

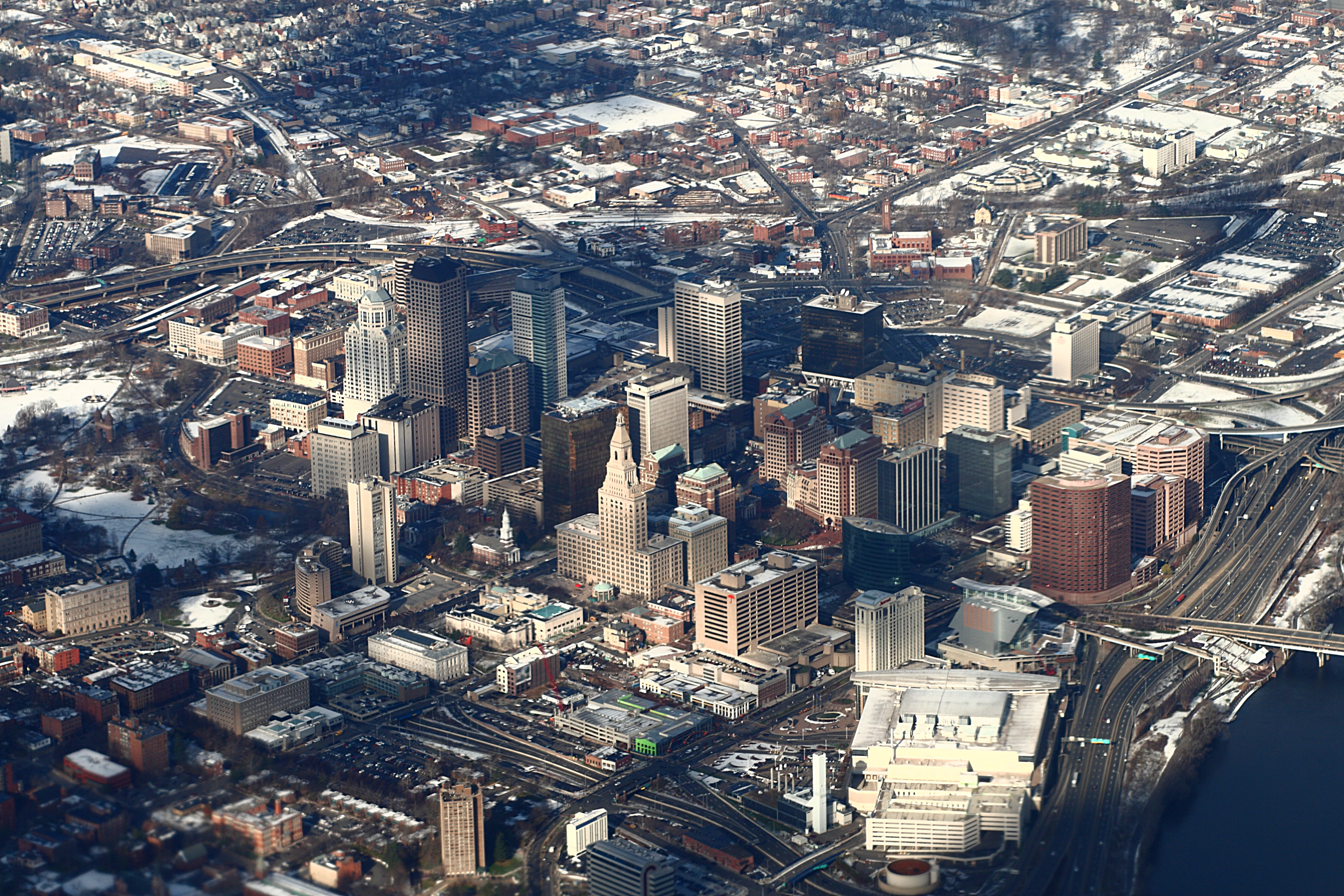
8. Hartford, Connecticut

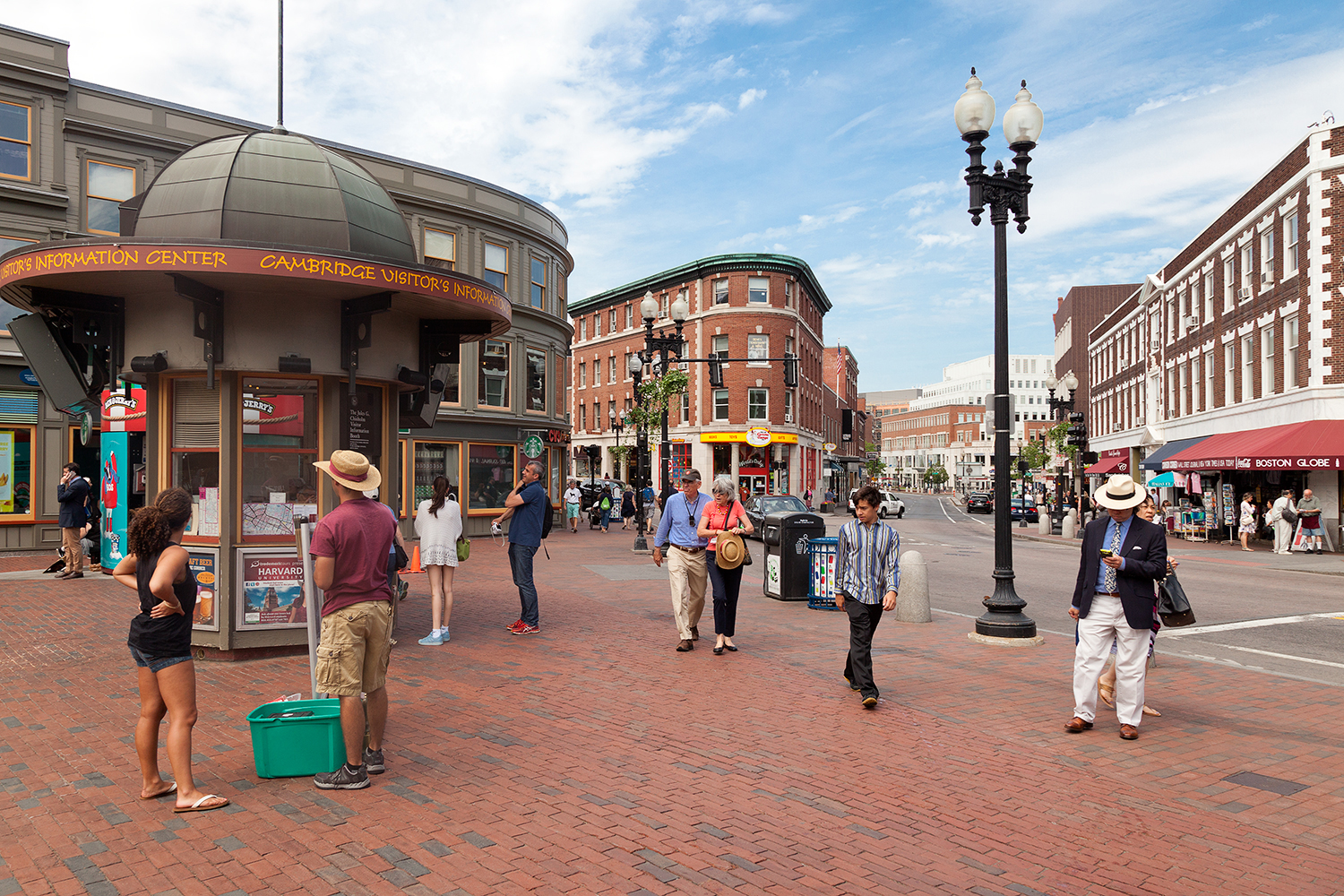
9. Cambridge, Massachusetts

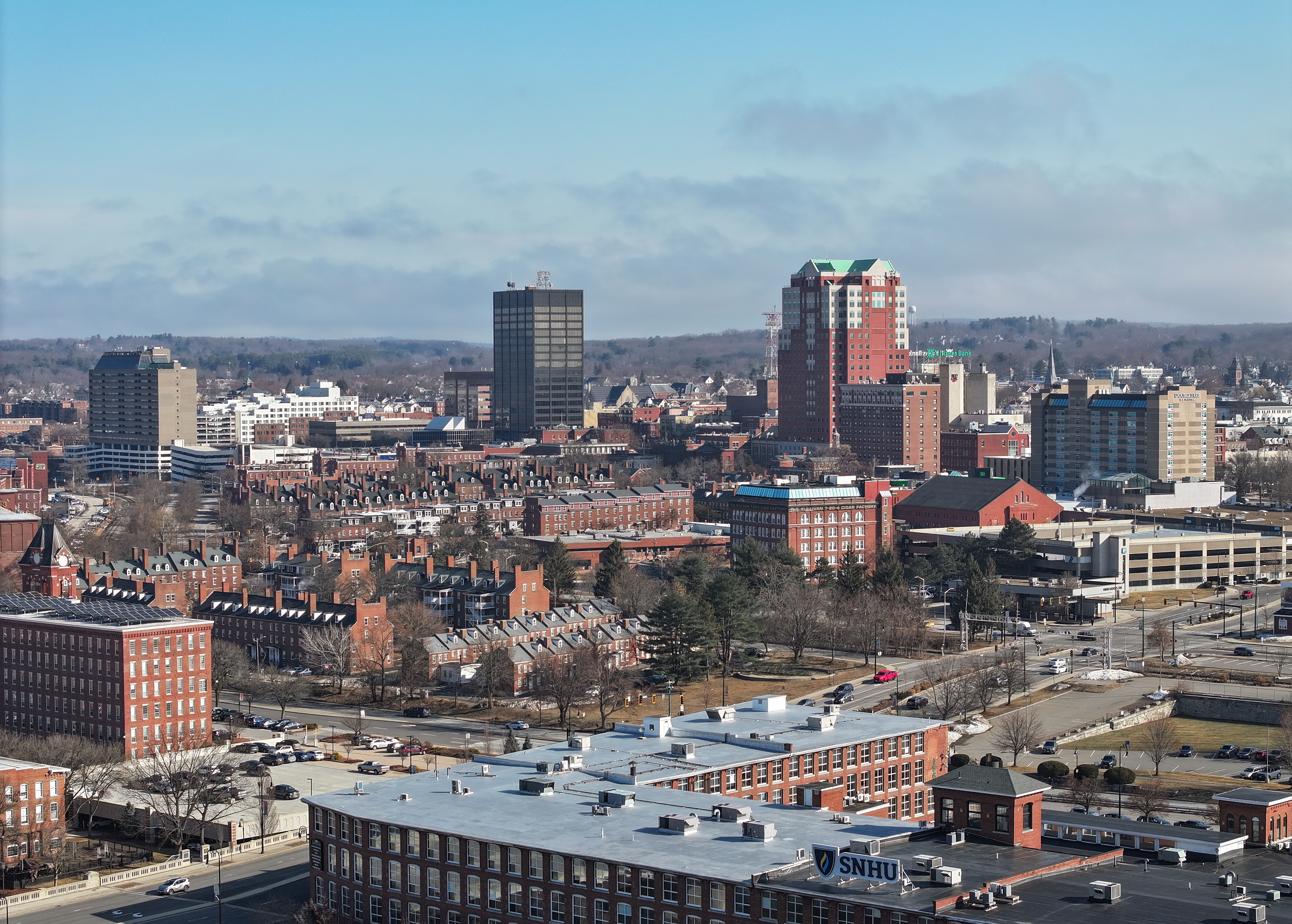
10. Manchester, New Hampshire

=== Metropolitan areas and capitals ===
==== Metropolitan areas ====
The following are metropolitan statistical areas as defined by the United States Census Bureau.

Rank	Metropolitan area	State(s)	Population (2020)	Encompassing CSA
1	Boston	Massachusetts; New Hampshire	4,941,632	Boston
2	Providence	Massachusetts; Rhode Island	1,676,579	Boston
3	Hartford	Connecticut	1,213,531	Hartford
4	Worcester	Connecticut; Massachusetts	978,529	Boston
5	Bridgeport	Connecticut	957,419	New York
6	New Haven	Connecticut	864,835	Hartford
7	Springfield	Massachusetts	699,162	Springfield
8	Portland	Maine	551,740	Portland
9	Manchester-Nashua	New Hampshire	422,937	Boston
10	Norwich-New London	Connecticut	268,555	Hartford
11	Barnstable	Massachusetts	228,996	Boston
12	Burlington	Vermont	225,562	Burlington
13	Bangor	Maine	152,199	—N/a
14	Pittsfield	Massachusetts	129,026	—N/a
15	Lewiston-Auburn	Maine	111,139	Portland

==== State capitals ====
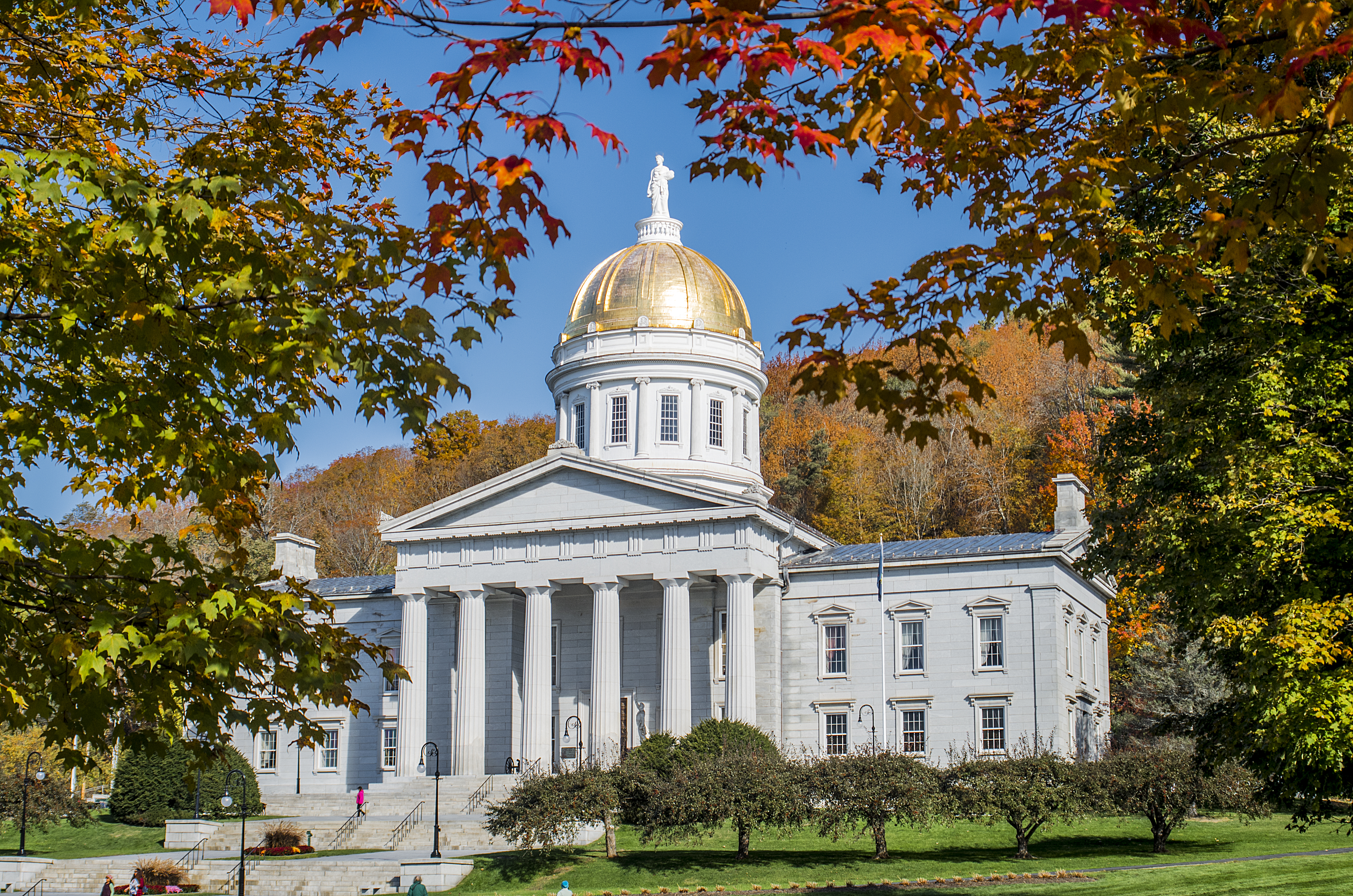
Montpelier, Vermont, is the smallest state capital in the United States.

- Hartford, Connecticut
- Augusta, Maine
- Boston, Massachusetts
- Concord, New Hampshire
- Providence, Rhode Island
- Montpelier, Vermont

== Demographics ==
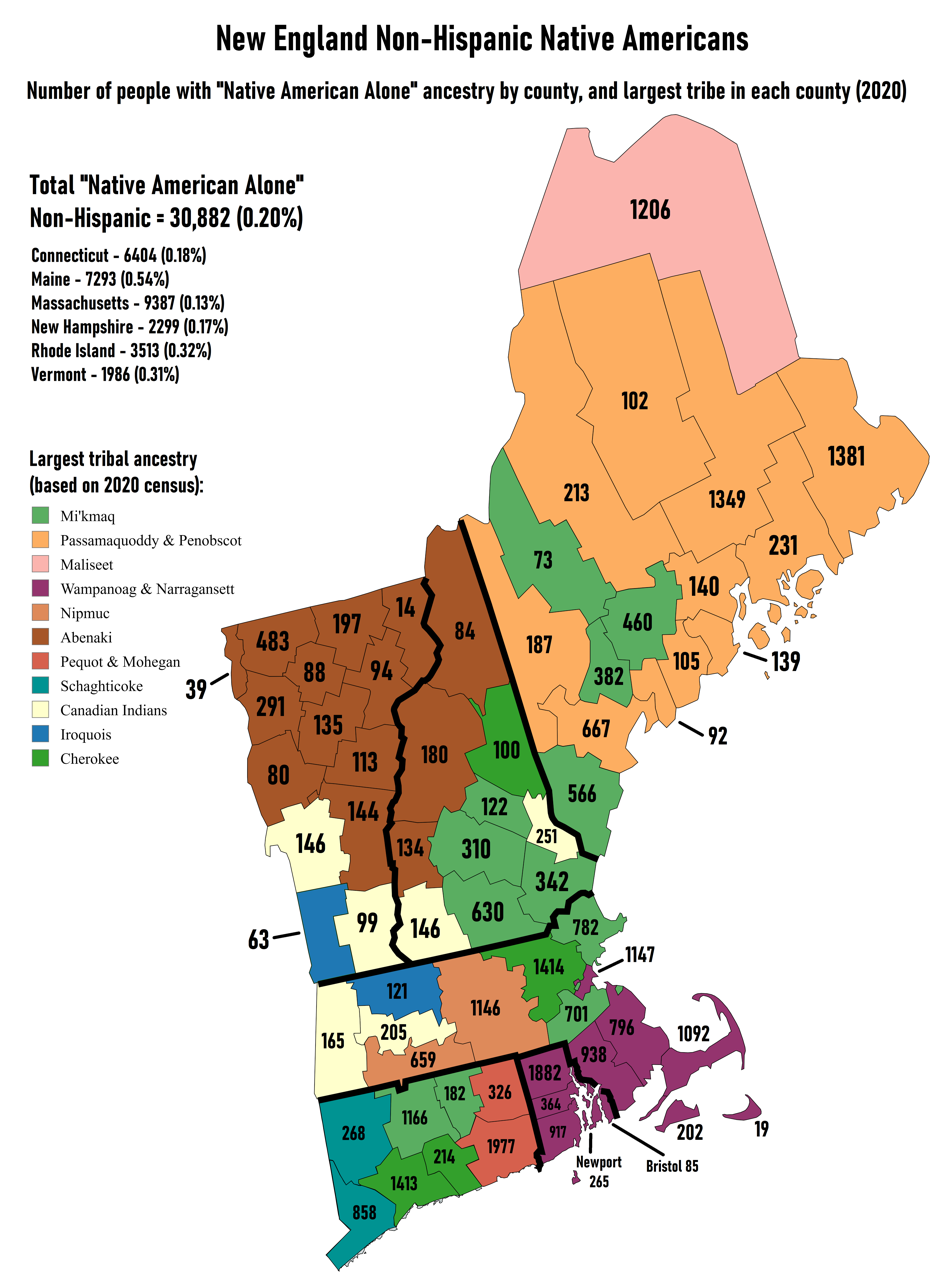

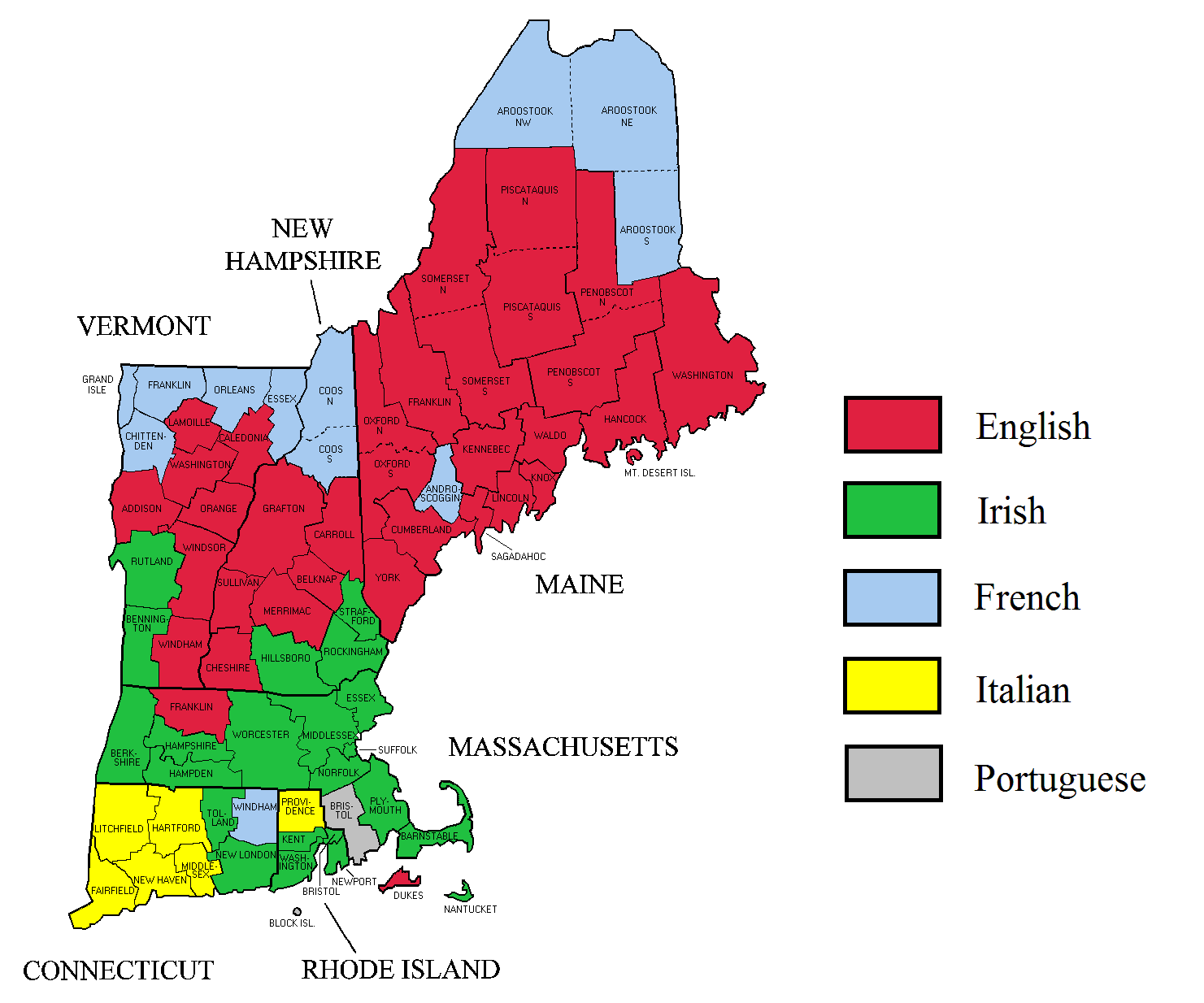
Largest self-reported ancestry groups in New England. Americans of Irish descent form a plurality in most of Massachusetts, while Americans of English descent form a plurality in much of the central parts of Vermont and New Hampshire as well as nearly all of Maine.

In 2020, New England had a population of 15,116,205, a growth of 4.6% from 2010. Massachusetts is the most populous state with 7,029,917 residents, while Vermont is the least populous state with 643,077 residents. Boston is by far the region's most populous city and metropolitan area.

Although a great disparity exists between New England's northern and southern portions, the region's average population density is 234.93 inhabitants/sq mi (90.7/km^{2}). New England has a significantly higher population density than that of the U.S. as a whole (79.56/sq mi), or even just the contiguous 48 states (94.48/sq mi). Three-quarters of the population of New England, and most of the major cities, are in southern New England—the states of Connecticut, Massachusetts and Rhode Island—where the combined population density is 786.83/sq mi (2000 census). In northern New England—the states of Maine, New Hampshire, and Vermont—the combined population density is 63.56/sq mi (2000 census).

According to the 2006–08 American Community Survey, 48.7% of New Englanders were male and 51.3% were female. Approximately 22.4% of the population were under 18 years of age; 13.5% were over 65 years of age. The six states of New England have the lowest birth rate in the U.S.

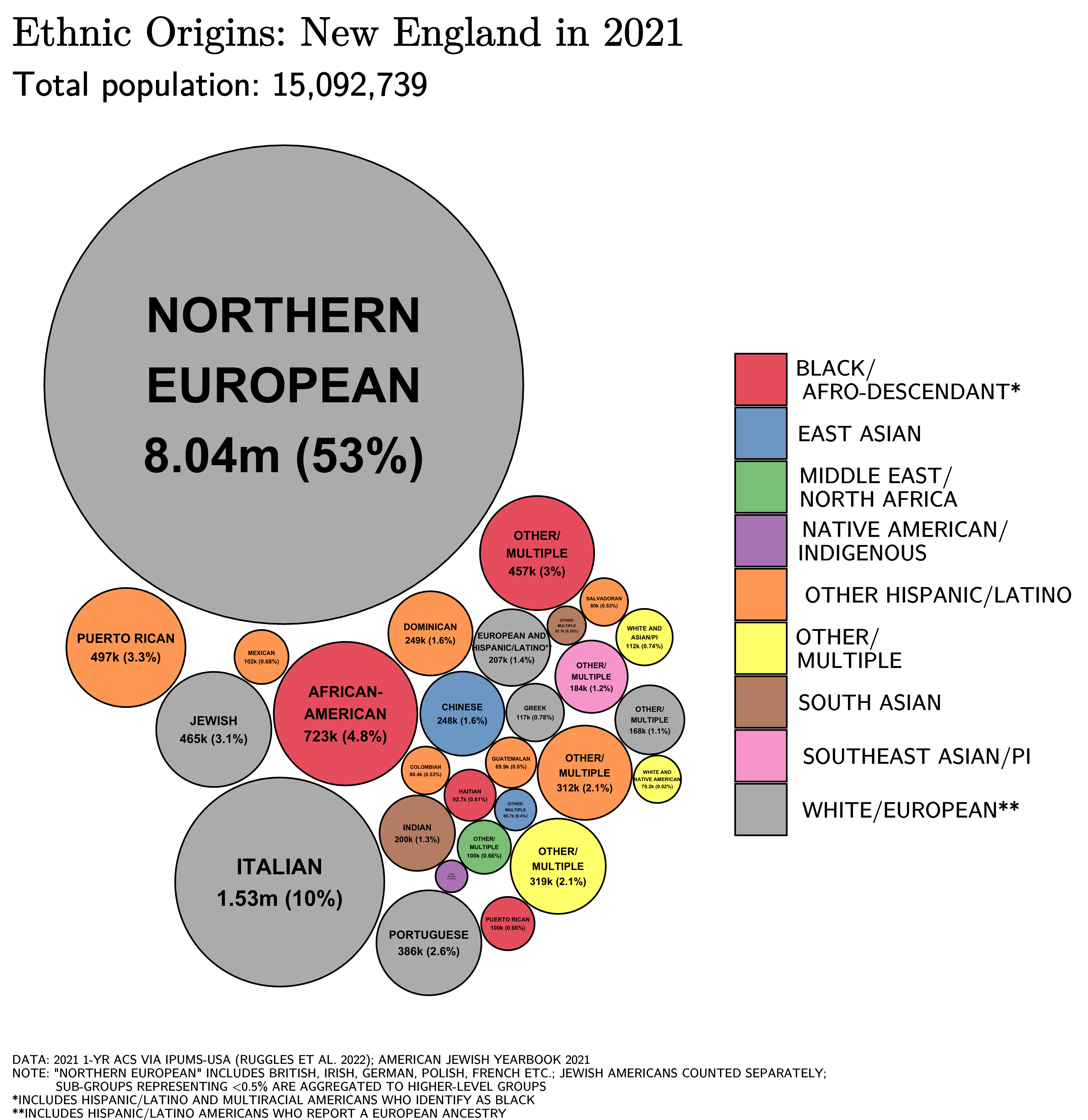
Ethnic origins in New England

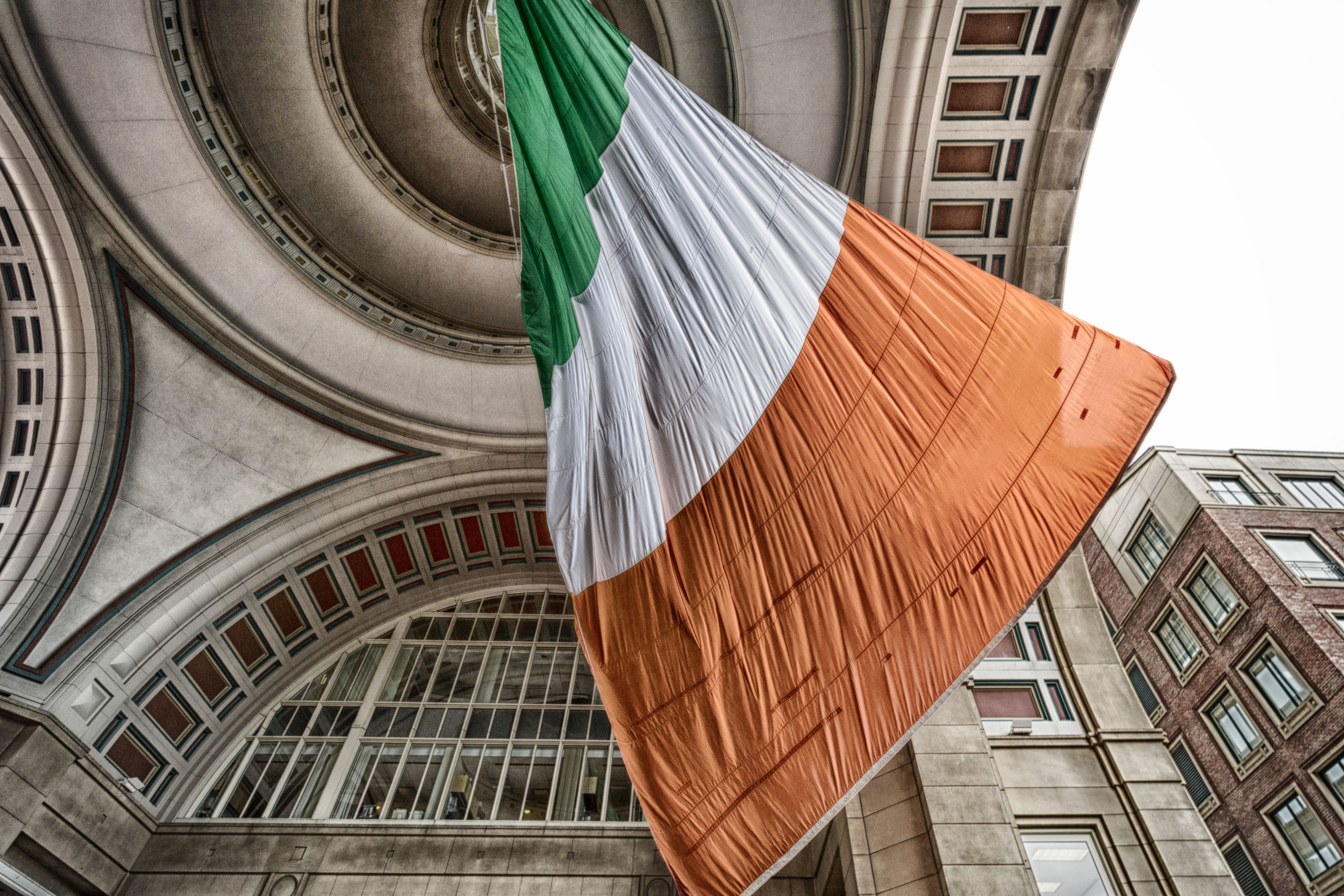
World's largest Irish flag in Boston. People who claim Irish descent constitute the largest ethnic ancestry in New England.

White Americans make up the majority of New England's population at 73.4% of the total population, Hispanic and Latino Americans are New England's largest minority, and they are the second-largest group in the region behind non-Hispanic European Americans. As of 2014, Hispanics and Latinos of any race made up 10.2% of New England's population. Connecticut had the highest proportion at 13.9%, while Vermont had the lowest at 1.3%. There were nearly 1.5 million Hispanic and Latino individuals reported in New England in 2014.

Puerto Ricans were the most numerous of the Hispanic and Latino subgroups. Over 660,000 Puerto Ricans lived in New England in 2014, forming 4.5% of the population. The Dominican population is over 200,000, and the Mexican and Guatemalan populations are each over 100,000. Americans of Cuban descent are scant in number; there were roughly 26,000 Cuban Americans in the region in 2014. People of all other Hispanic and Latino ancestries, including Salvadoran, Colombian and Bolivian, formed 2.5% of New England's population and numbered over 361,000 combined.

According to the 2014 American Community Survey, the top ten largest reported European ancestries were the following: Irish: 19.2% (2.8 million); English (includes "American" ancestry): 16.7% (2.4 million); Italian: 13.6% (2.0 million); French and French Canadian: 13.1% (1.9 million); German: 7.4% (1.1 million); Polish: 4.9% (roughly 715,000); Portuguese: 3.2% (467,000); Scottish: 2.5% (370,000); Russian: 1.4% (206,000); and Greek: 1.0% (152,000).

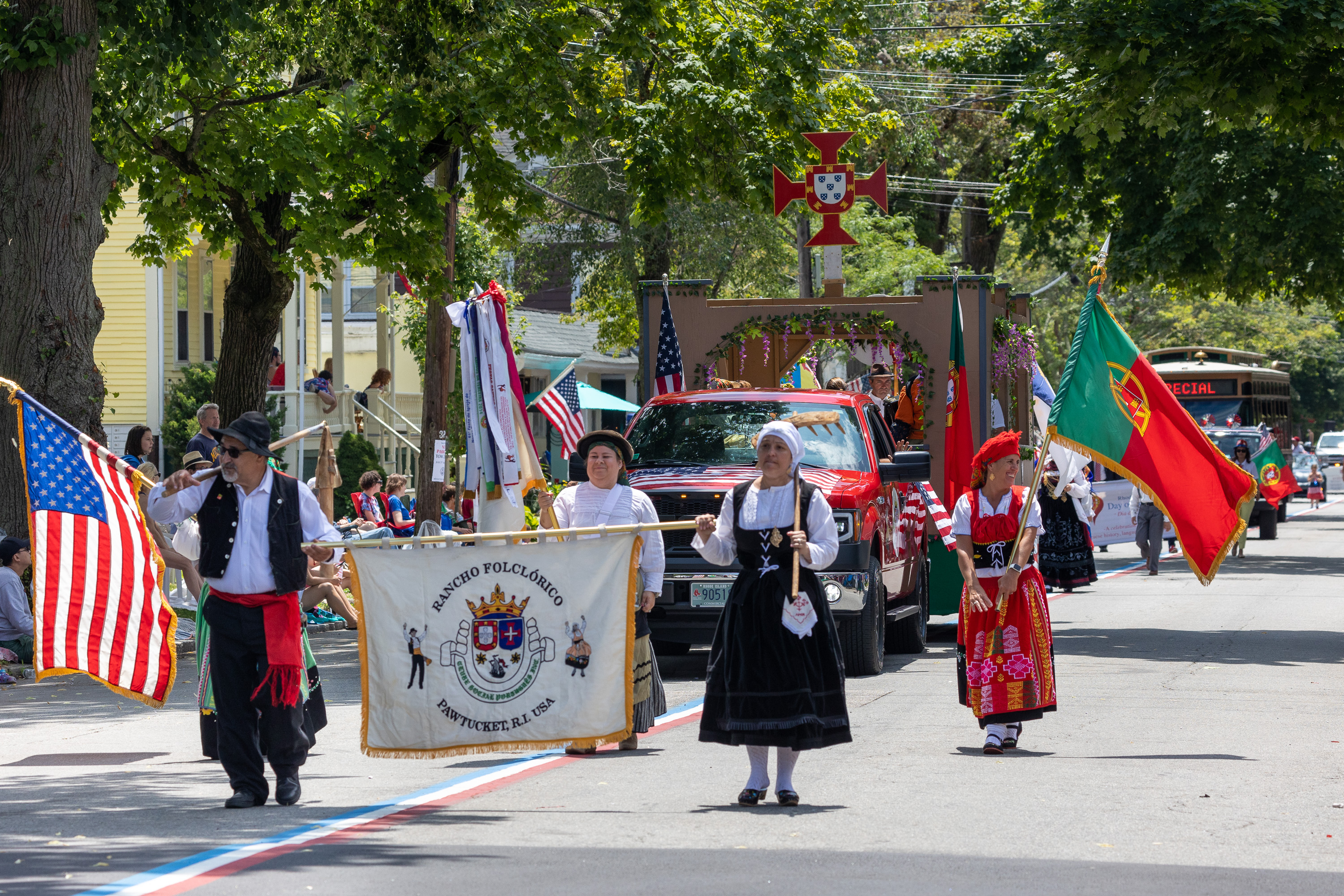
Southeastern New England is home to a number of Lusophone ethnic enclaves.

English is, by far, the most common language spoken at home. Approximately 81.3% of all residents (11.3 million people) over the age of five spoke only English at home. Roughly 1,085,000 people (7.8% of the population) spoke Spanish at home, and roughly 970,000 people (7.0% of the population) spoke other Indo-European languages at home. Over 403,000 people (2.9% of the population) spoke an Asian or Pacific Island language at home. Slightly fewer (about 1%) spoke French at home, although this figure is above 20% in northern New England, which borders francophone Québec. Roughly 99,000 people (0.7% of the population) spoke languages other than these at home.

As of 2014, approximately 87% of New England's inhabitants were born in the U.S., while over 12% were foreign-born. Of foreign-born residents, 35.8% were born in Latin America, 28.6% were born in Asia, 22.9% were born in Europe, and 8.5% were born in Africa.

Southern New England forms an integral part of the BosWash megalopolis, a conglomeration of urban centers that spans from Boston to Washington, D.C. The region includes three of the four most densely populated states in the U.S.; only New Jersey has a higher population density than the states of Rhode Island, Massachusetts, and Connecticut.

Greater Boston, which includes parts of southern New Hampshire, has a total population of approximately 4.8 million, while over half the population of New England falls inside Boston's Combined Statistical Area of over 8.2 million.

== Economy ==
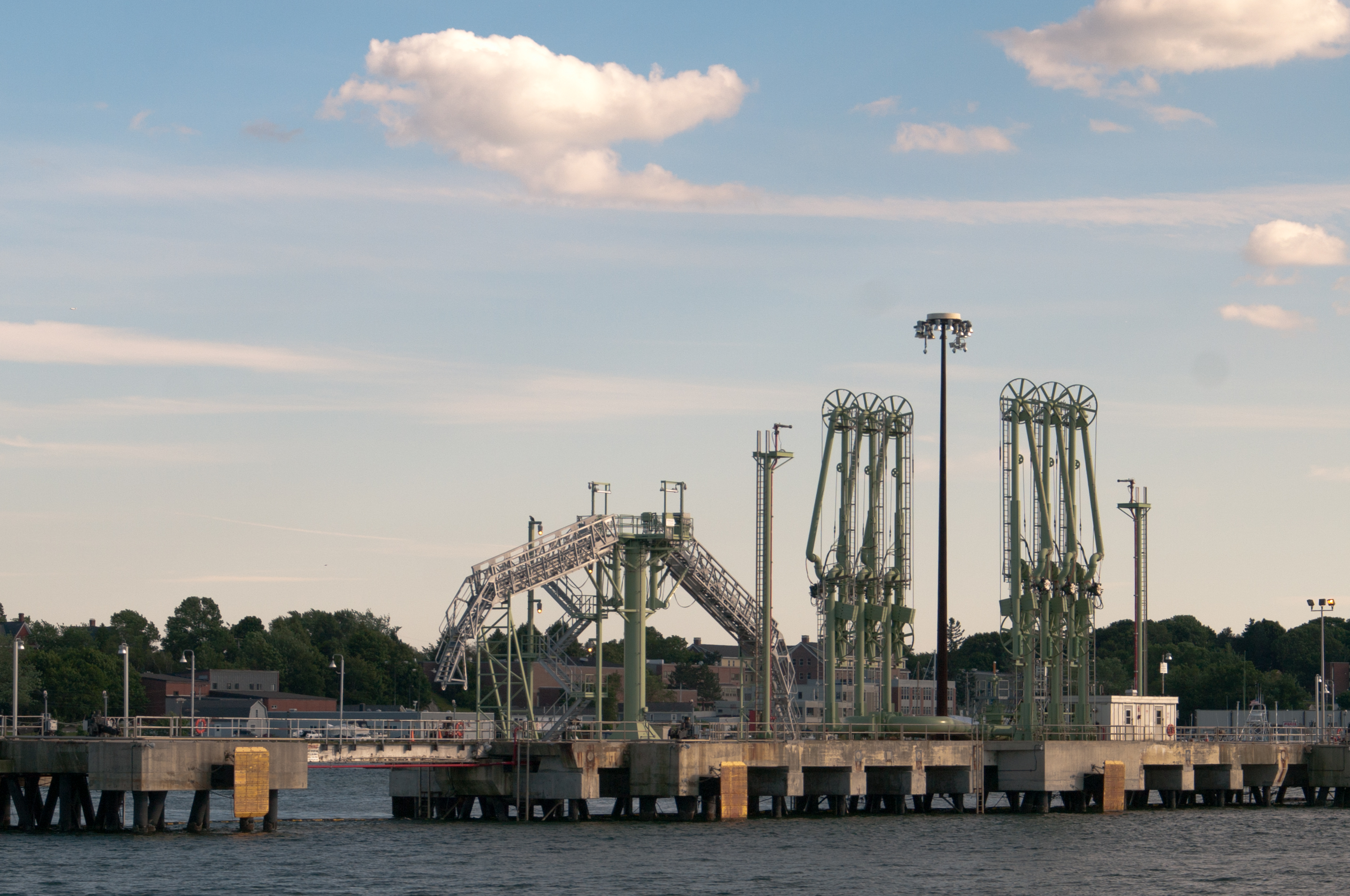
The Port of Portland in Portland, Maine, is the largest tonnage seaport in New England.

Several factors combine to make the New England economy unique. The region is distant from the geographic center of the country, and it is a relatively small region but densely populated. It historically has been an important center of industry and manufacturing and a supplier of natural resource products, such as granite, lobster, and codfish. The service industry is important, including tourism, education, financial and insurance services, and architectural, building and construction services. The U.S. Department of Commerce has called the New England economy a microcosm for the entire U.S. economy.

The region underwent a long period of deindustrialization in the first half of the 20th century, as traditional manufacturing companies relocated to the Midwest, with textile and furniture manufacturing migrating to the South. In the late-20th century, an increasing portion of the regional economy included high technology, military defense industry, finance and insurance services, and education and health services. As of 2018, the GDP of New England was $1.1 trillion.

New England exports food products ranging from fish to lobster, cranberries, potatoes, and maple syrup. About half of the region's exports consist of industrial and commercial machinery, such as computers and electronic and electrical equipment. Granite is quarried at Barre, Vermont, guns made at Springfield, Massachusetts, Exeter, New Hampshire and Saco, Maine, submarines at Groton, Connecticut, surface naval vessels at Bath, Maine, and hand tools at Turners Falls, Massachusetts.

=== Urban centers ===
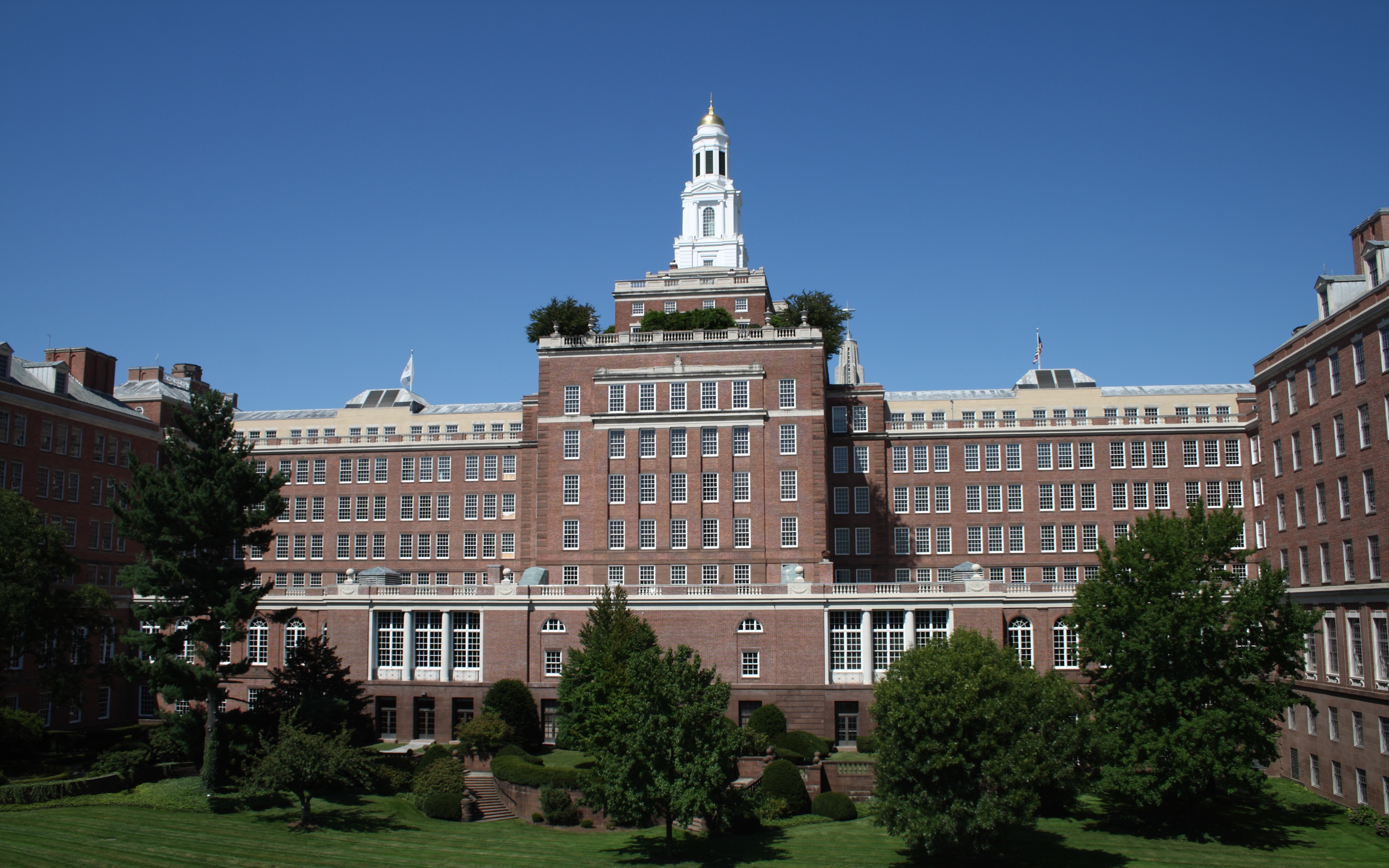
The Hartford headquarters of Aetna is housed in a 1931 Colonial Revival building.

In 2017, Boston was ranked as having the ninth-most competitive financial center in the world and the fourth-most competitive in the United States. Boston-based Fidelity Investments helped popularize the mutual fund in the 1980s and has made Boston one of the top financial centers in the United States. The city is home to the headquarters of Santander Bank and a center for venture capital firms. State Street Corporation specializes in asset management and custody services and is based in the city.

Boston is also a printing and publishing center. Houghton Mifflin Harcourt is headquartered there, along with Bedford-St. Martin's and Beacon Press. The city is also home to the Hynes Convention Center in the Back Bay and the Seaport Hotel and Seaport World Trade Center and Boston Convention and Exhibition Center on the South Boston waterfront.

The General Electric Corporation announced its decision to move the company's global headquarters to the Boston Seaport District from Fairfield, Connecticut, in 2016, citing factors including Boston's preeminence in the realm of higher education. The city also holds the headquarters to several major athletic and footwear companies, including Converse, New Balance and Reebok. Rockport, Puma and Wolverine World Wide have headquarters or regional offices just outside the city.

Hartford is the historic international center of the insurance industry, with companies such as Aetna, Conning & Company, The Hartford, Harvard Pilgrim Health Care, The Phoenix Companies and Hartford Steam Boiler based in the city, and The Travelers Companies and Lincoln National Corporation have major operations in the city. It is also home to the corporate headquarters of U.S. Fire Arms Mfg. Co., United Technologies, and Virtus Investment Partners.

Fairfield County, Connecticut, has a large concentration of investment management firms in the area, most notably Bridgewater Associates (one of the world's largest hedge fund companies), Aladdin Capital Management and Point72 Asset Management. Moreover, many international banks have their North American headquarters in Fairfield County, such as NatWest Group and UBS.

=== Agriculture ===
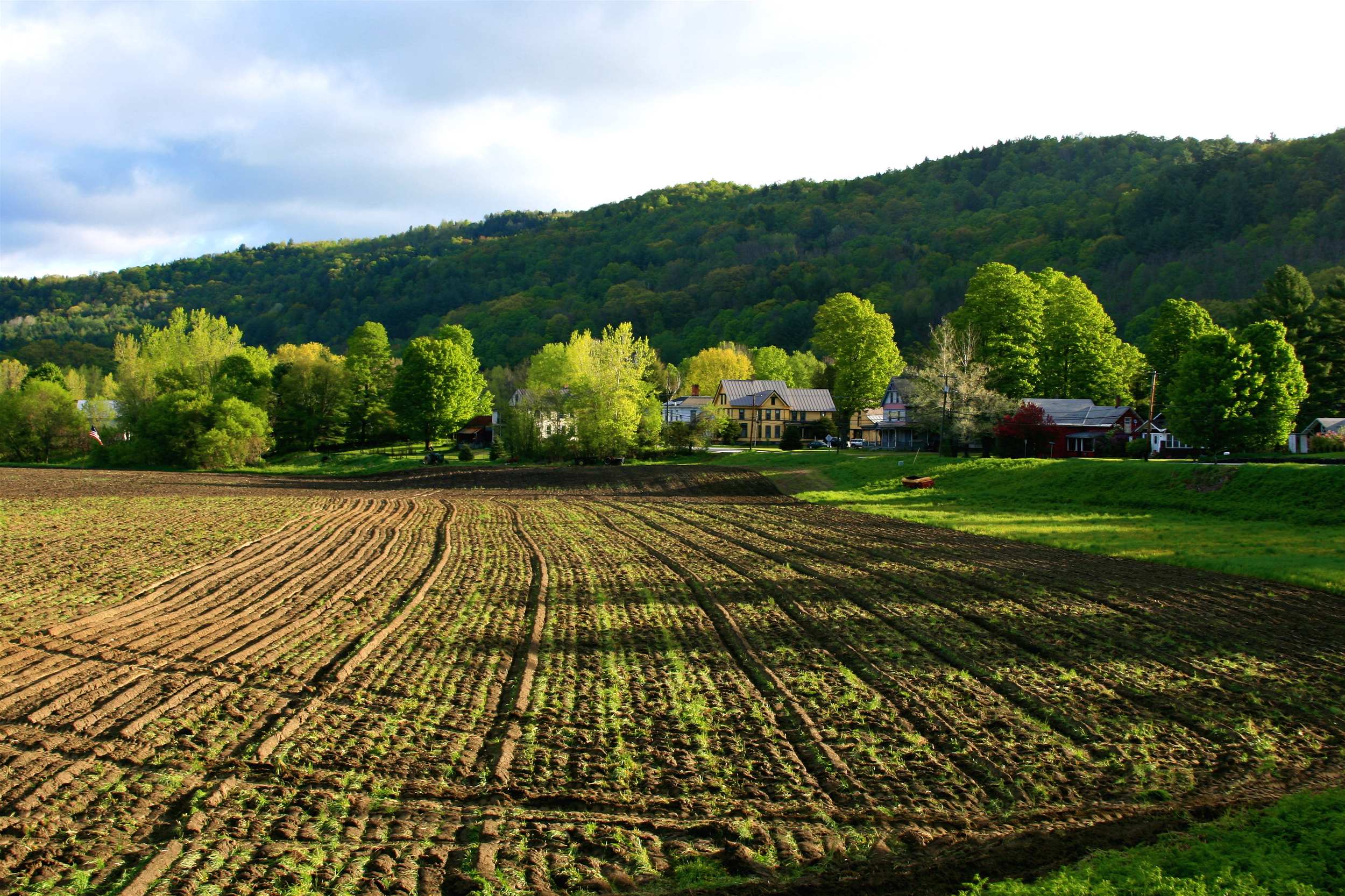
A plowed field in Bethel, Vermont

Agriculture is limited by the area's rocky soil, cool climate, and small area. Some New England states, however, are ranked highly among U.S. states for particular areas of production. Maine is ranked ninth for aquaculture, and has abundant potato fields in its northeast part. Vermont is fifteenth for dairy products, and Connecticut and Massachusetts seventh and eleventh for tobacco, respectively. Cranberries are grown in Massachusetts' Cape Cod-Southcoast-South Shore area, and blueberries in Maine.

=== Energy ===
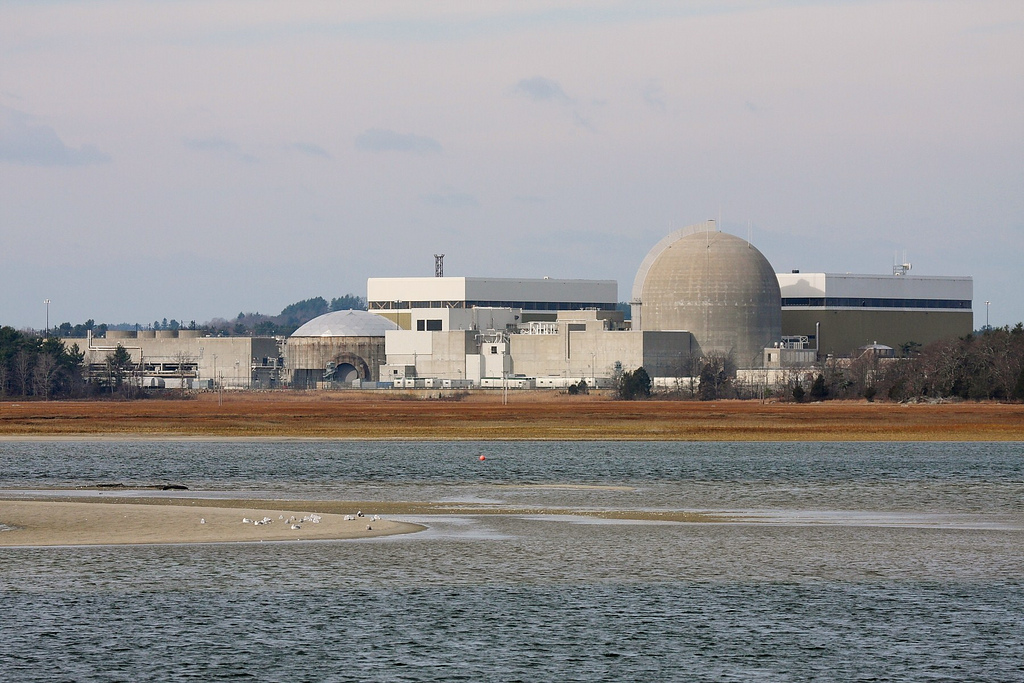
Seabrook Station Nuclear Power Plant in Seabrook, New Hampshire

The region is mostly energy-efficient compared to the U.S. at large, with every state but Maine ranking within the ten most energy-efficient states; every state in New England also ranks within the ten most expensive states for electricity prices. Wind power, mainly from offshore sources, is expected to gain market share in the 2020s.

=== Overall tax burden ===
In 2023, three of the six New England states were among the top ten states in the country in terms of taxes paid per taxpayer, while one was among the top five least. The rankings being #3 Maine (11.14%), #4 Vermont (10.28%), #5 Connecticut (9.83%), #11 Rhode Island (9.07%), #20 Massachusetts (8.48%), and #48 New Hampshire (6.14%). While overall tax burden varies widely, all six states sport exceptionally high property taxes with five of the six states being within the nationwide top 10. The rankings being #1 Maine (5.33%), #2 Vermont (4.98%), #3 New Hampshire (4.94%), #6 Connecticut (4.24%), #7 Rhode Island (4.17%), and #13 Massachusetts (3.42%).

== Government ==
=== Town meetings ===
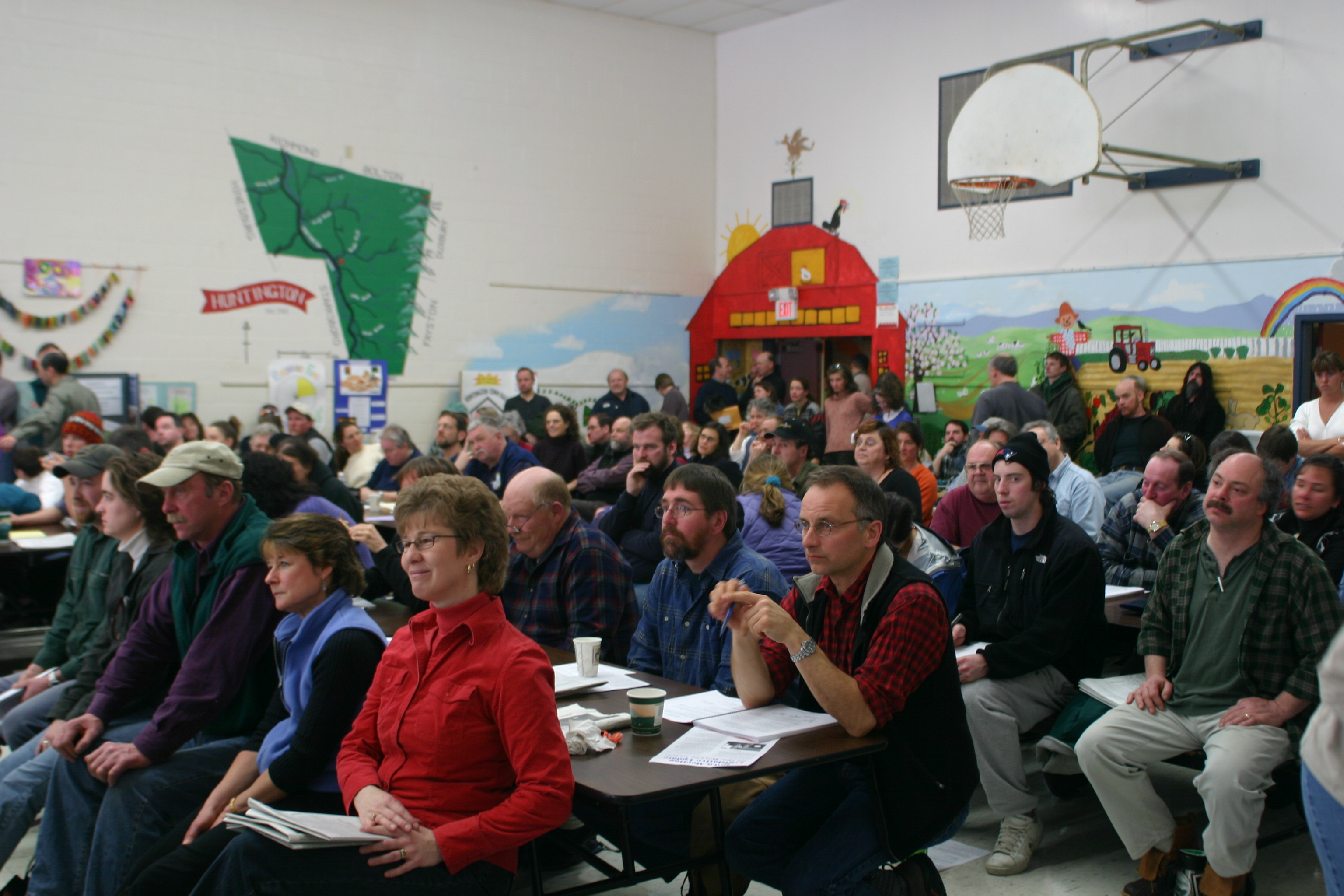
A New England town meeting in Huntington, Vermont

New England town meetings were derived from meetings held by church elders, and are still an integral part of government in many New England towns. At such meetings, any citizen of the town may discuss issues with other members of the community and vote on them. This is the strongest example of direct democracy in the U.S. today, and the strong democratic tradition was even apparent in the early 19th century, when Alexis de Tocqueville wrote in Democracy in America:

New England, where education and liberty are the daughters of morality and religion, where society has acquired age and stability enough to enable it to form principles and hold fixed habits, the common people are accustomed to respect intellectual and moral superiority and to submit to it without complaint, although they set at naught all those privileges which wealth and birth have introduced among mankind. In New England, consequently, the democracy makes a more judicious choice than it does elsewhere.

By contrast, James Madison wrote in Federalist No. 55 that, regardless of the assembly, "passion never fails to wrest the scepter from reason. Had every Athenian citizen been a Socrates, every Athenian assembly would still have been a mob." The use and effectiveness of town meetings is still discussed by scholars, as well as the possible application of the format to other regions and countries.

=== Elections ===
State and national elected officials in New England recently have been elected mainly from the Democratic Party. The region is generally considered to be the most liberal in the United States, with more New Englanders identifying as liberals than Americans elsewhere. In 2010, four of six of the New England states were polled as the most liberal in the United States.

Flag of the New England Governor's Conference (NEGC)

As of 2021, five of the six states of New England have voted for every Democratic presidential nominee since 1992. In that time, New Hampshire has voted for Democratic nominees in every presidential election except 2000, when George W. Bush narrowly won the state. 2020 was a particularly strong year for Democratic nominee Joe Biden in New England, winning 61.2% of the total vote in the six states, the highest percentage for Democrats since the landslide election of 1964. As of the 117th Congress, all members of the U.S. House of Representatives from New England are members of the Democratic Party, and all but one of its senators caucus with the Democrats. Two of those senators, although caucusing with Democrats, are the only independents currently serving in Congress: Bernie Sanders, a self-described democratic socialist, representing Vermont, and Angus King, an independent representing Maine.

In the 2008 presidential election, Barack Obama carried all six New England states by 9 percentage points or more. He carried every county in New England except for Piscataquis County, Maine, which he lost by 4% to Senator John McCain (R-AZ). Pursuant to the reapportionment following the 2010 census, New England collectively has 33 electoral votes.

2024 United States Presidential Election Results in New England
Party	Total voters	Percentage
Kamala Harris (D)	4,493,658	57.81%
Donald Trump (R)	3,095,522	39.82%
Third Parties	183,870	2.37%
Total	7,773,050	100%

The following table presents the vote percentage for the popular-vote winner for each New England state, New England as a whole, and the United States as a whole, in each presidential election from 1900 to 2020, with the vote percentage for the Republican candidate shaded in red and the vote percentage for the Democratic candidate shaded in blue:

Year	Connecticut	Maine	Massachusetts	New Hampshire	Rhode Island	Vermont	New England	United States
2024	56.4%	52.4%	61.2%	50.6%	55.5%	63.9%	59.2%	49.8%
2020	59.2%	53.1%	65.6%	52.7%	59.4%	66.1%	61.2%	51.3%
2016	54.6%	47.8%	60.0%	46.8%	54.4%	56.7%	55.3%	48.2%
2012	58.1%	56.3%	60.7%	52.0%	62.7%	66.6%	59.1%	51.1%
2008	60.6%	57.7%	61.8%	54.1%	62.9%	67.5%	60.6%	52.9%
2004	54.3%	53.6%	61.9%	50.2%	59.4%	58.9%	57.7%	50.7%
2000	55.9%	49.1%	59.8%	48.1%	61.0%	50.6%	56.1%	48.4%
1996	52.8%	51.6%	61.5%	49.3%	59.7%	53.4%	56.8%	49.2%
1992	42.2%	38.8%	47.5%	38.9%	47.0%	46.1%	44.4%	43.0%
1988	52.0%	55.3%	53.2%	62.5%	55.6%	51.1%	49.5%	53.4%
1984	60.7%	60.8%	51.2%	68.7%	51.7%	57.9%	56.2%	58.8%
1980	48.2%	45.6%	41.9%	57.7%	47.7%	44.4%	44.7%	50.8%
1976	52.1%	48.9%	56.1%	54.7%	55.4%	54.3%	51.7%	50.1%
1972	58.6%	61.5%	54.2%	64.0%	53.0%	62.7%	52.5%	60.7%
1968	49.5%	55.3%	63.0%	52.1%	64.0%	52.8%	56.1%	43.4%
1964	67.8%	68.8%	76.2%	63.9%	80.9%	66.3%	72.8%	61.1%
1960	53.7%	57.0%	60.2%	53.4%	63.6%	58.6%	56.0%	49.7%
1956	63.7%	70.9%	59.3%	66.1%	58.3%	72.2%	62.0%	57.4%
1952	55.7%	66.0%	54.2%	60.9%	50.9%	71.5%	56.1%	55.2%
1948	49.5%	56.7%	54.7%	52.4%	57.6%	61.5%	51.5%	49.6%
1944	52.3%	52.4%	52.8%	52.1%	58.6%	57.1%	52.4%	53.4%
1940	53.4%	51.1%	53.1%	53.2%	56.7%	54.8%	52.8%	54.7%
1936	55.3%	55.5%	51.2%	49.7%	53.1%	56.4%	50.9%	60.8%
1932	48.5%	55.8%	50.6%	50.4%	55.1%	57.7%	49.1%	57.4%
1928	53.6%	68.6%	50.2%	58.7%	50.2%	66.9%	53.2%	58.2%
1924	61.5%	72.0%	62.3%	59.8%	59.6%	78.2%	63.3%	54.0%
1920	62.7%	68.9%	68.5%	59.8%	64.0%	75.8%	66.7%	60.3%
1916	49.8%	51.0%	50.5%	49.1%	51.1%	62.4%	51.1%	49.2%
1912	39.2%	39.4%	35.5%	39.5%	39.0%	37.1%	36.6%	41.8%
1908	59.4%	63.0%	58.2%	59.3%	60.8%	75.1%	60.2%	51.6%
1904	58.1%	67.4%	57.9%	60.1%	60.6%	78.0%	60.4%	56.4%
1900	56.9%	61.9%	57.6%	59.3%	59.7%	75.7%	59.4%	51.6%

==== Political party strength ====
Judging purely by party registration rather than voting patterns, New England today is one of the most Democratic regions in the U.S. According to Gallup, Connecticut, Massachusetts, Rhode Island, and Vermont are "solidly Democratic", Maine "leans Democratic", and New Hampshire is a swing state.

Though New England is today considered a Democratic Party stronghold, much of the region was staunchly Republican before the mid-twentieth century. This changed in the late 20th century, in large part due to demographic shifts and the Republican Party's adoption of socially conservative platforms as part of its strategic shift towards the South. For example, Vermont voted Republican in every presidential election from 1856 through 1988 with the exception of 1964, and has voted Democratic every election since. Maine and Vermont were the only two states in the nation to vote against Democrat Franklin D. Roosevelt all four times he ran for president. Republicans in New England are today considered by both liberals and conservatives to be more moderate (socially liberal) compared to Republicans in other parts of the U.S.

State	Governor	Senior U.S. Senator	Junior U.S. Senator	U.S. House Delegation	Upper House Majority	Lower House Majority
CT	Lamont, N.	Blumenthal, R.	Murphy, C.	Democratic 5–0	Democratic 25–11	Democratic 102–49
ME	Mills, J.	Collins, S.	King, A.^{[†]}	Democratic 2–0	Democratic 20–15	Democratic 76–73–2
MA	Healey, M.	Warren, E.	Markey, E.	Democratic 9–0	Democratic 35–5	Democratic 132–25–1
NH	Ayotte, K.	Shaheen, J.	Hassan, M.	Democratic 2–0	Republican 16–8	Republican 222–178
RI	McKee, D.	Reed, J.	Whitehouse, S.	Democratic 2–0	Democratic 34–4	Democratic 64–10–1
VT	Scott, P.	Sanders, B.^{[†]}	Welch, P.	Democratic 1–0	Democratic 16–13–1	Democratic 87–57–5–3
:^{†} Elected as an independent, but caucuses with the Democratic Party.

==== New Hampshire primary ====
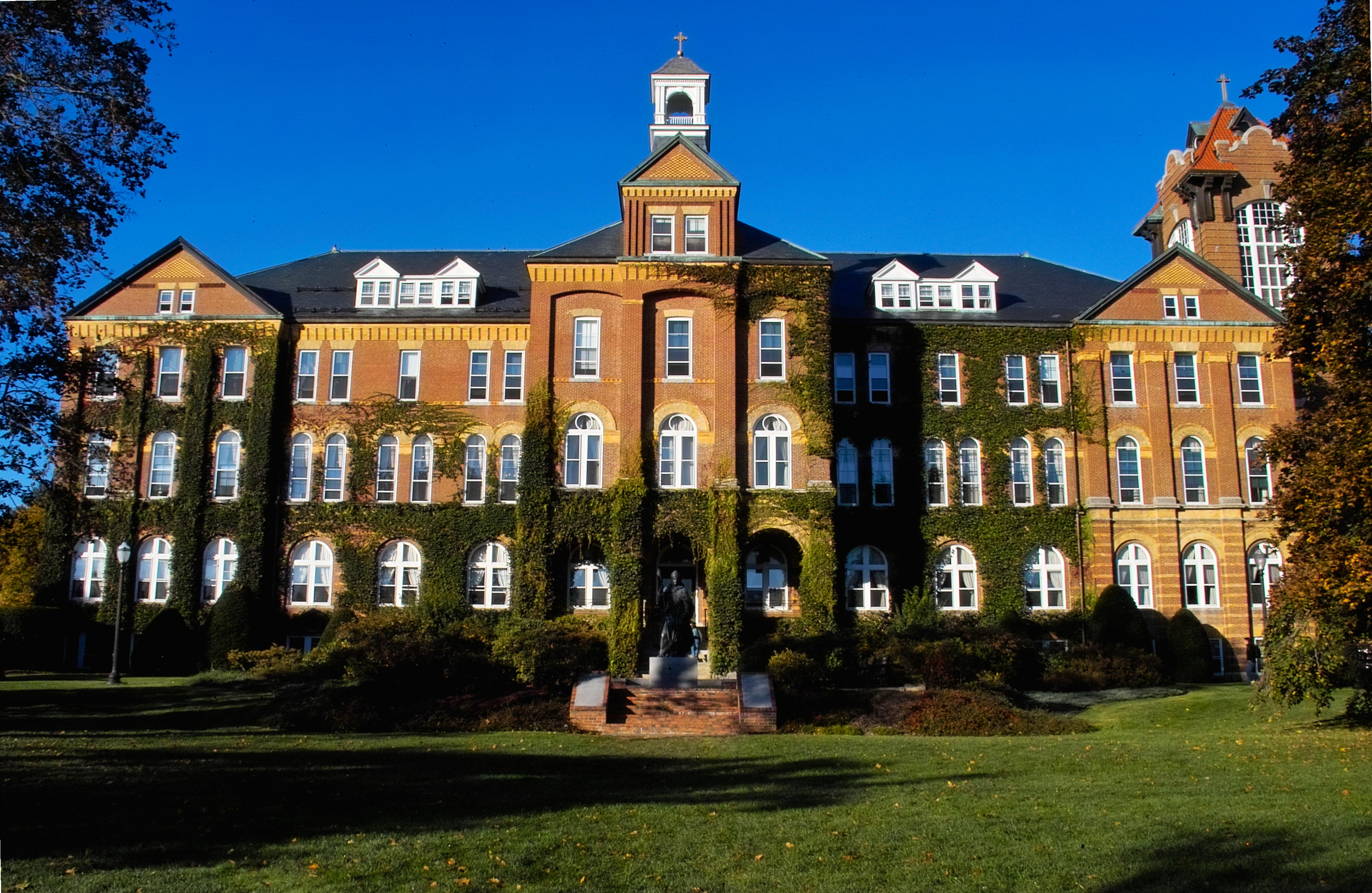
Alumni Hall at Saint Anselm College has served as a backdrop for media reports during the New Hampshire primary.

Historically, the New Hampshire primary has been the first in a series of nationwide political party primary elections held in the United States every four years. Held in the state of New Hampshire, it usually marks the beginning of the U.S. presidential election process. Even though few delegates are chosen from New Hampshire, the primary has always been pivotal to both New England and American politics. One college in particular, Saint Anselm College, has been home to numerous national presidential debates and visits by candidates to its campus.

== Education ==
=== Colleges and universities ===
New England contains some of the oldest and most renowned institutions of higher learning in the United States and the world. Harvard College was the first such institution, founded in 1636 at Cambridge, Massachusetts, to train preachers. Yale University was founded in Old Saybrook, Connecticut, in 1701, and awarded the nation's first doctoral (PhD) degree in 1861. Yale moved to New Haven, Connecticut, in 1718, where it has remained to the present day.

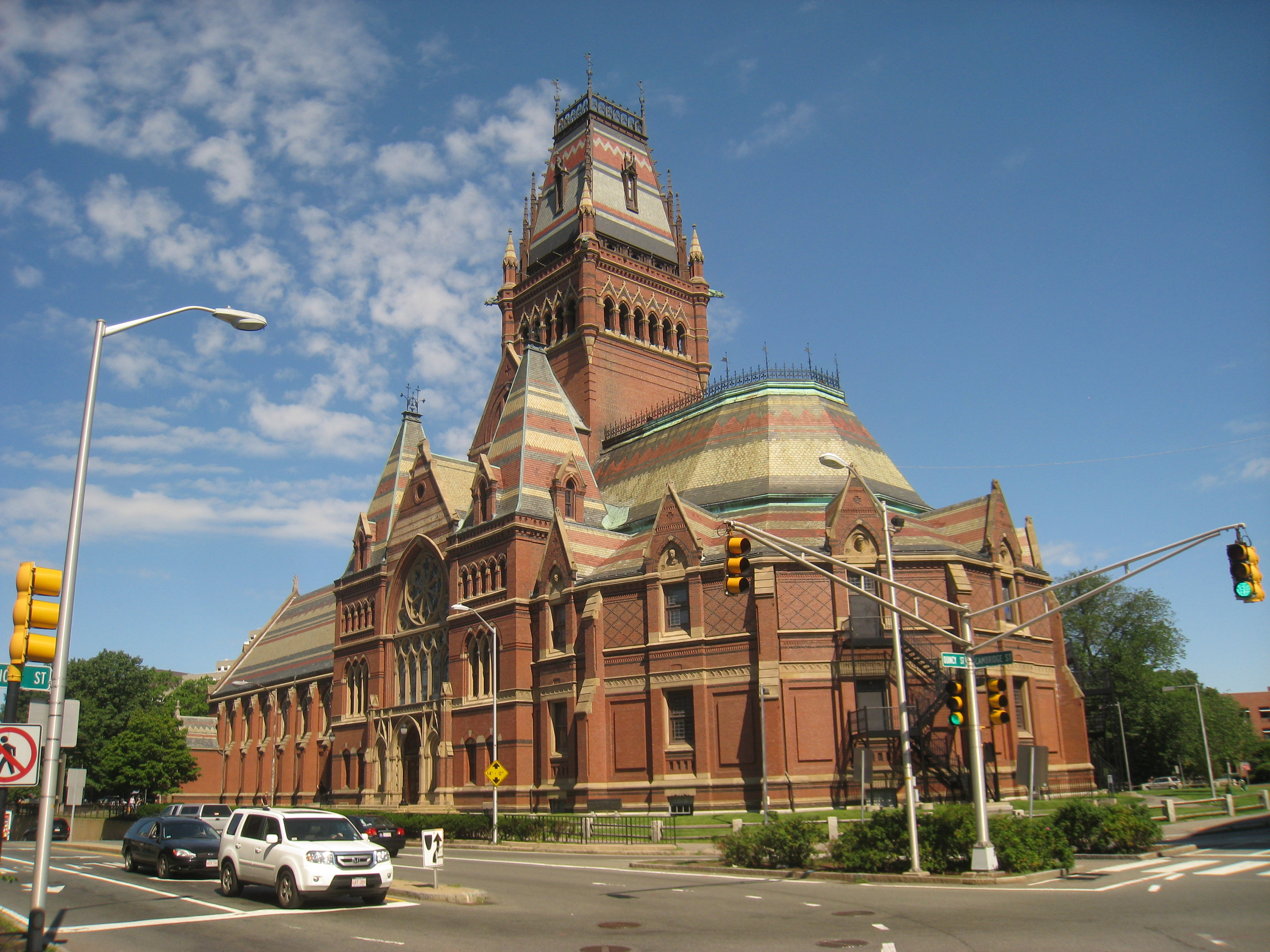
New England is home to four of the eight Ivy League universities. Pictured here is Memorial Hall of Harvard University.

Brown University was the first college in the nation to accept students of all religious affiliations, and is the seventh oldest U.S. institution of higher learning. It was founded in Providence, Rhode Island, in 1764. Dartmouth College was founded five years later in Hanover, New Hampshire, with the mission of educating the local American Indian population as well as English youth. The University of Vermont, the fifth oldest university in New England, was founded in 1791, the same year that Vermont joined the Union.

In addition to four out of eight Ivy League schools, New England contains the Massachusetts Institute of Technology (MIT), the bulk of educational institutions that are identified as the "Little Ivies", four of the original Seven Sisters, one of the eight original Public Ivies, the Colleges of Worcester Consortium in central Massachusetts, and the Five Colleges consortium in western Massachusetts. The University of Maine, the University of New Hampshire, the University of Connecticut, the University of Massachusetts at Amherst, the University of Rhode Island, and the University of Vermont are the flagship state universities in the region.

=== Private and independent secondary schools ===
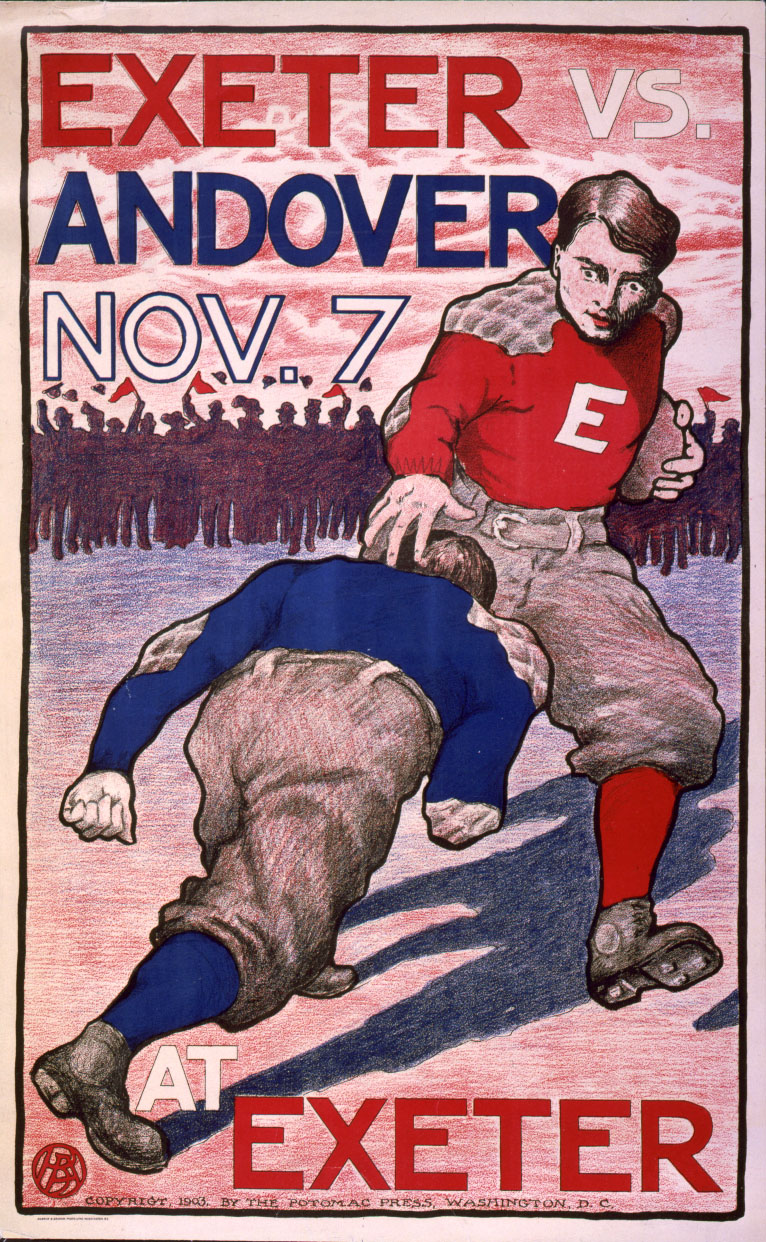
Phillips Exeter Academy and Phillips Academy at Andover are two prestigious New England secondary schools founded in the late 18th century

At the pre-college level, New England is home to many upscale private schools. The concept of the elite "New England prep school" (preparatory school) and the "preppy" lifestyle is an iconic part of the region's image.

See the list of private schools for each state:
Connecticut, Massachusetts, Maine, New Hampshire, Rhode Island, Vermont.

=== Public education ===
New England is home to some of the oldest public schools in the nation and was the first region in the United States to implement universal compulsory schooling. Boston Latin School is the oldest public school in America and was attended by several signatories of the Declaration of Independence. Hartford Public High School is the second oldest operating high school in the U.S.

As of 2005, the National Education Association ranked Connecticut as having the highest-paid teachers in the country. Massachusetts and Rhode Island ranked eighth and ninth, respectively. New Hampshire, Rhode Island, and Vermont have cooperated in developing a New England Common Assessment Program test under the No Child Left Behind guidelines. These states can compare the resultant scores with each other.

=== Academic journals and press ===
Besides a vigorous newspaper press, there are numerous academic journals and publishing companies in the region, including The New England Journal of Medicine, Harvard University Press and Yale University Press. Some of its institutions lead the open access alternative to conventional academic publication, including MIT, the University of Connecticut, and the University of Maine. The Federal Reserve Bank of Boston publishes the New England Economic Review.

== Culture ==
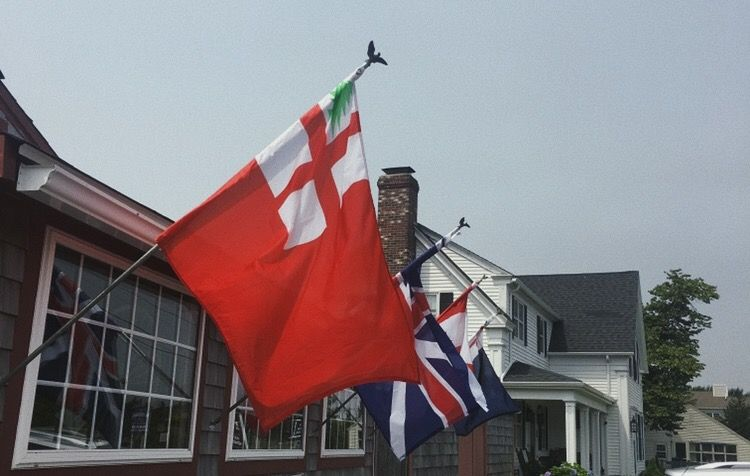
Flag of New England flying in Massachusetts. New Englanders maintain a strong sense of regional and cultural identity.

New England has an English heritage and a culture shaped by waves of immigration. In contrast to other American regions, most of New England's earliest Puritan settlers came from eastern England, contributing to the region's distinctive accents, foods, customs, and social structures. Within modern New England a cultural divide exists between urban New Englanders living along the densely populated coastline, and rural New Englanders in western Massachusetts, northwestern and northeastern Connecticut, Vermont, New Hampshire, and Maine, where population density is low. There is also a substantial divide between Connecticut and the other states of the region, owing to the former's close cultural and economic ties with the New York metropolitan area.

=== Religion ===
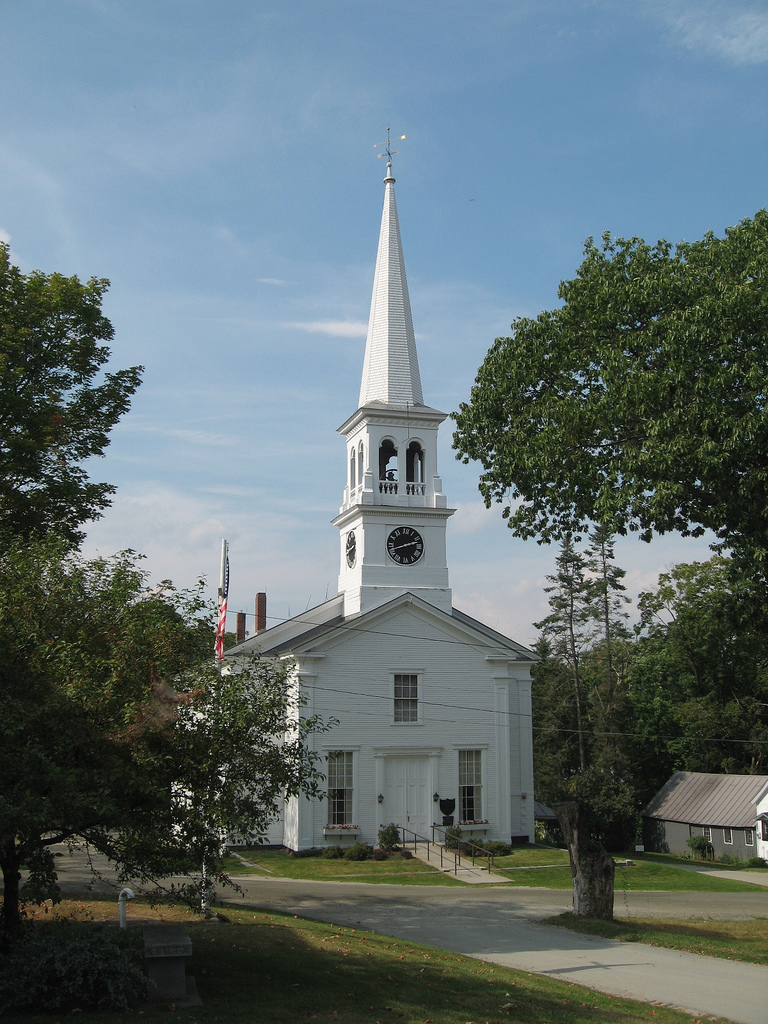
A classic New England Congregational church in Peacham, Vermont

Today, New England is the least religious region of the U.S. In 2009, less than half of those polled in Maine, Massachusetts, New Hampshire, and Vermont claimed that religion was an important part of their daily lives. Connecticut and Rhode Island are among the ten least religious states, where 55% and 53% of those polled (respectively) claimed that it was important. According to the American Religious Identification Survey, 34% of Vermonters reported having no religion; nearly one out of every four New Englanders identifies as having no religion, more than in any other part of the U.S. New England had one of the highest percentages of Catholics in the U.S. This number declined from 50% in 1990 to 36% in 2008.

=== Cultural roots ===
Many of the first European colonists of New England had a maritime orientation toward whaling (first noted about 1650) and fishing, in addition to farming. New England has developed a distinct cuisine, dialect, architecture, and government. New England cuisine has a reputation for its emphasis on seafood and dairy; clam chowder, lobster, and other products of the sea are among some of the region's most popular foods.

New England has largely preserved its regional character, especially in its historic places. The region has become more ethnically diverse, having seen waves of immigration from Ireland, Quebec, Italy, Portugal, Germany, Poland, Scandinavia, Asia, Latin America, Africa, other parts of the U.S., and elsewhere. The enduring European influence can be seen in the region in the use of traffic rotaries; the bilingual French and English towns of northern Vermont, Maine, and New Hampshire; the unique, often non-rhotic traditional coastal dialect akin to the southeastern half of England; and the region's heavy prevalence of English town- and county-names. These repeat from state to state, primarily due to settlers throughout the region having named their new towns after their old ones. For example, the town of North Yarmouth, Maine, was named by settlers from Yarmouth, Massachusetts, which was in turn named for Great Yarmouth (still locally called Yarmouth) in England. Every New England state has a town named Warren (a French-English noble family of wealthy settlers), and each except Rhode Island has a city/town named Franklin and Washington (constitutional founding fathers), Andover, Bridgewater, Chester, Manchester, Plymouth, and Windsor (these six were towns in England). Every state except Connecticut has a Lincoln and has a Richmond. Massachusetts, Vermont, and Maine each contain a Franklin County.

=== Cuisine ===
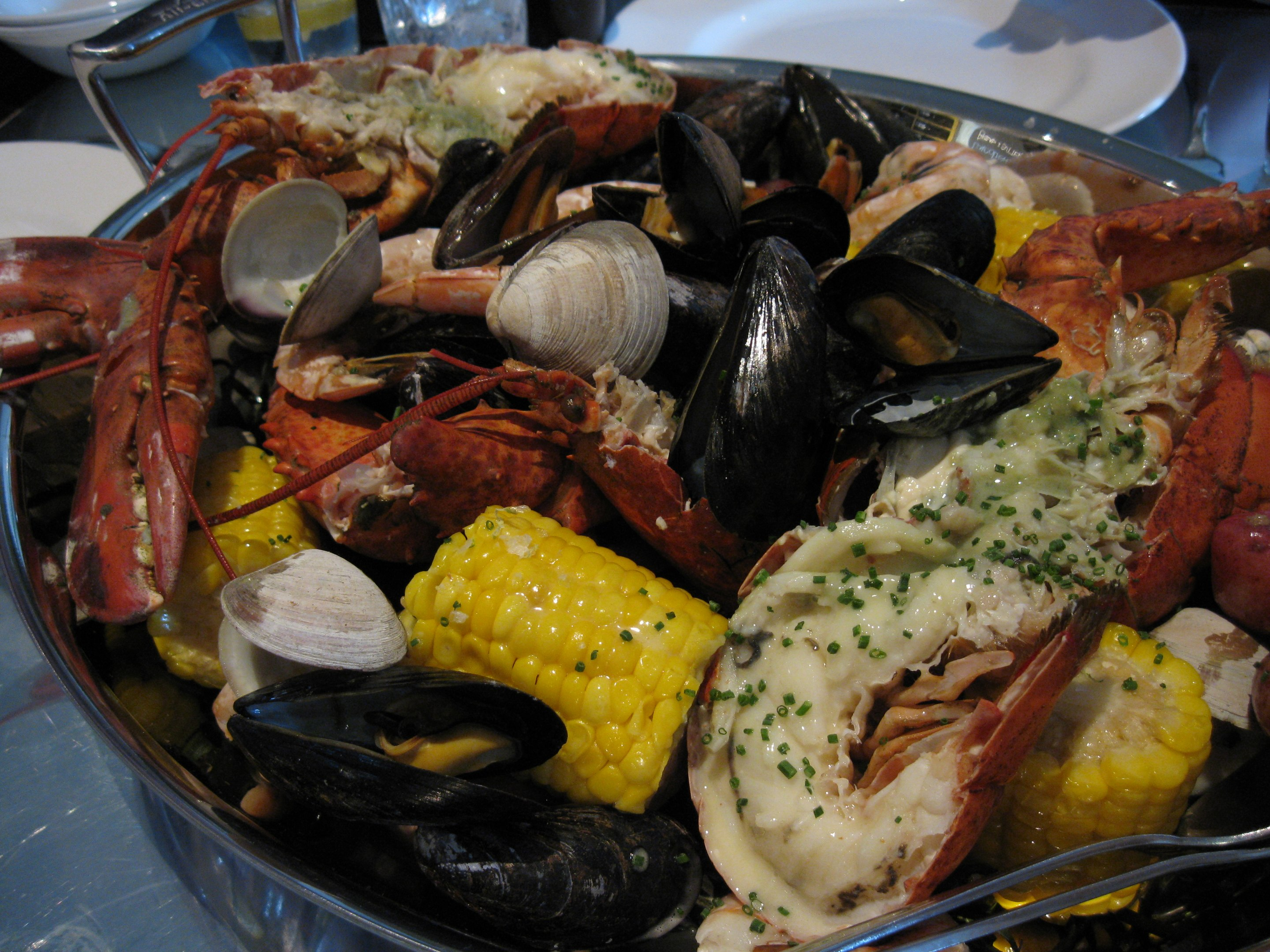
Clam Bake

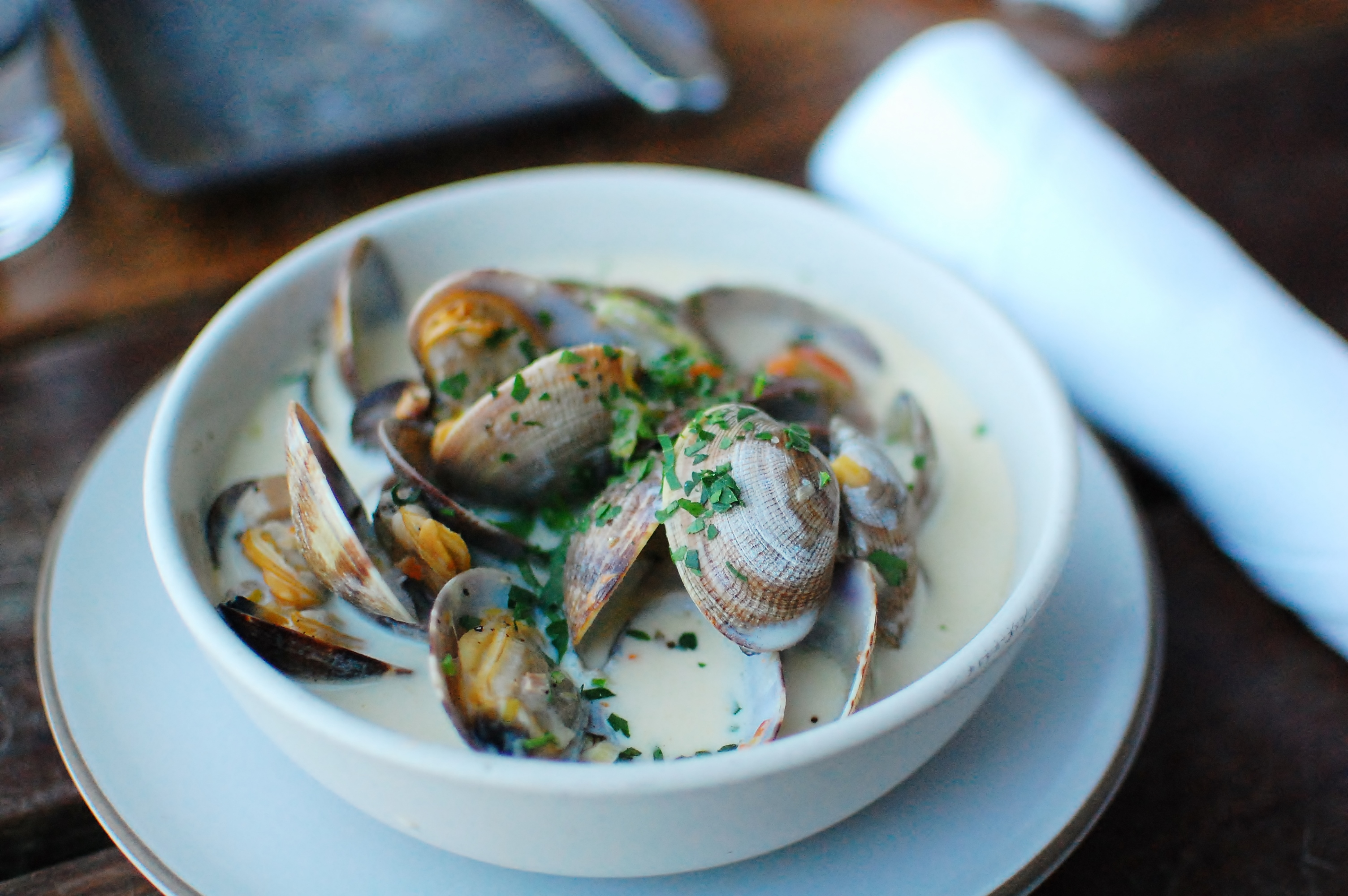
Clam chowder

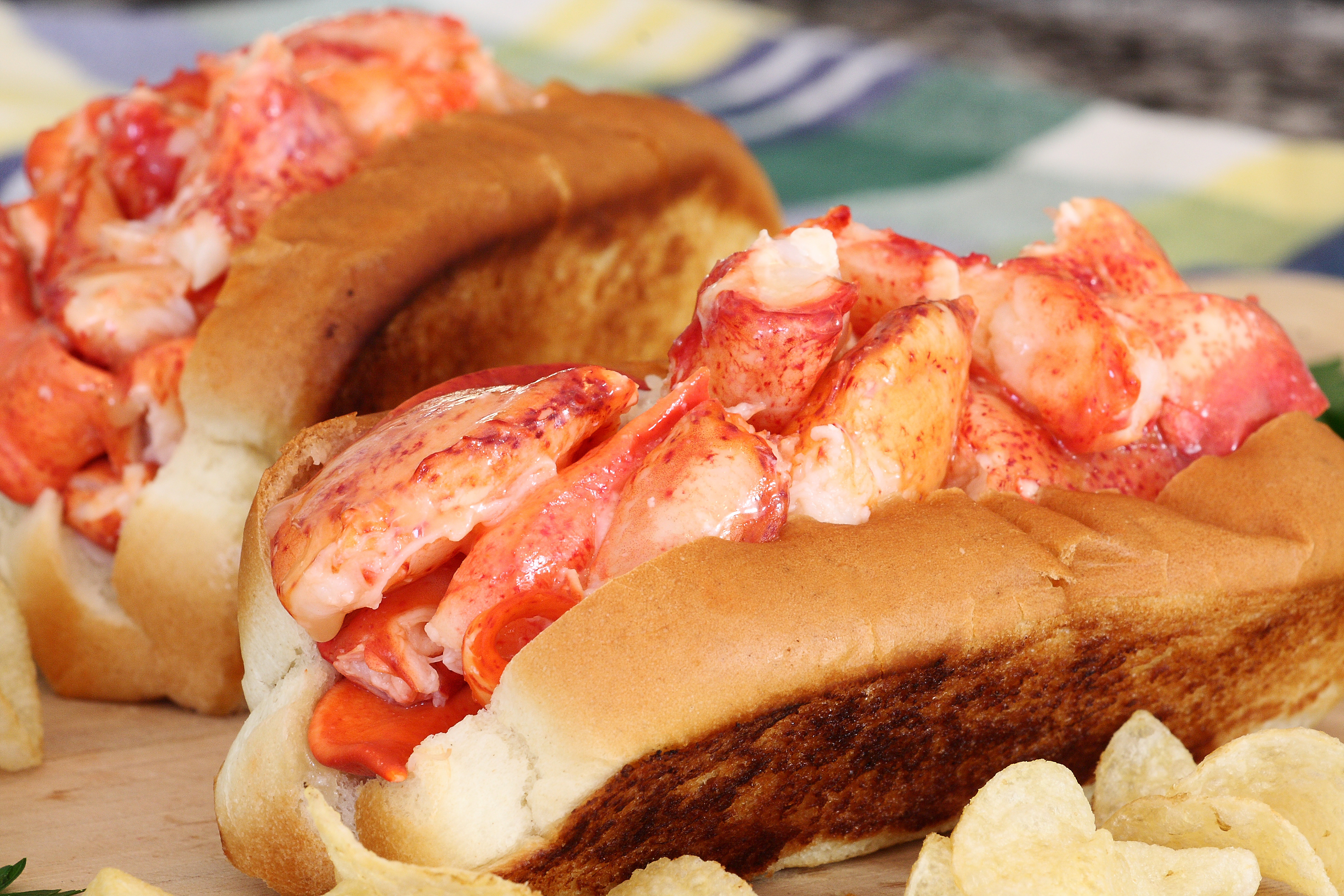
Lobster rolls

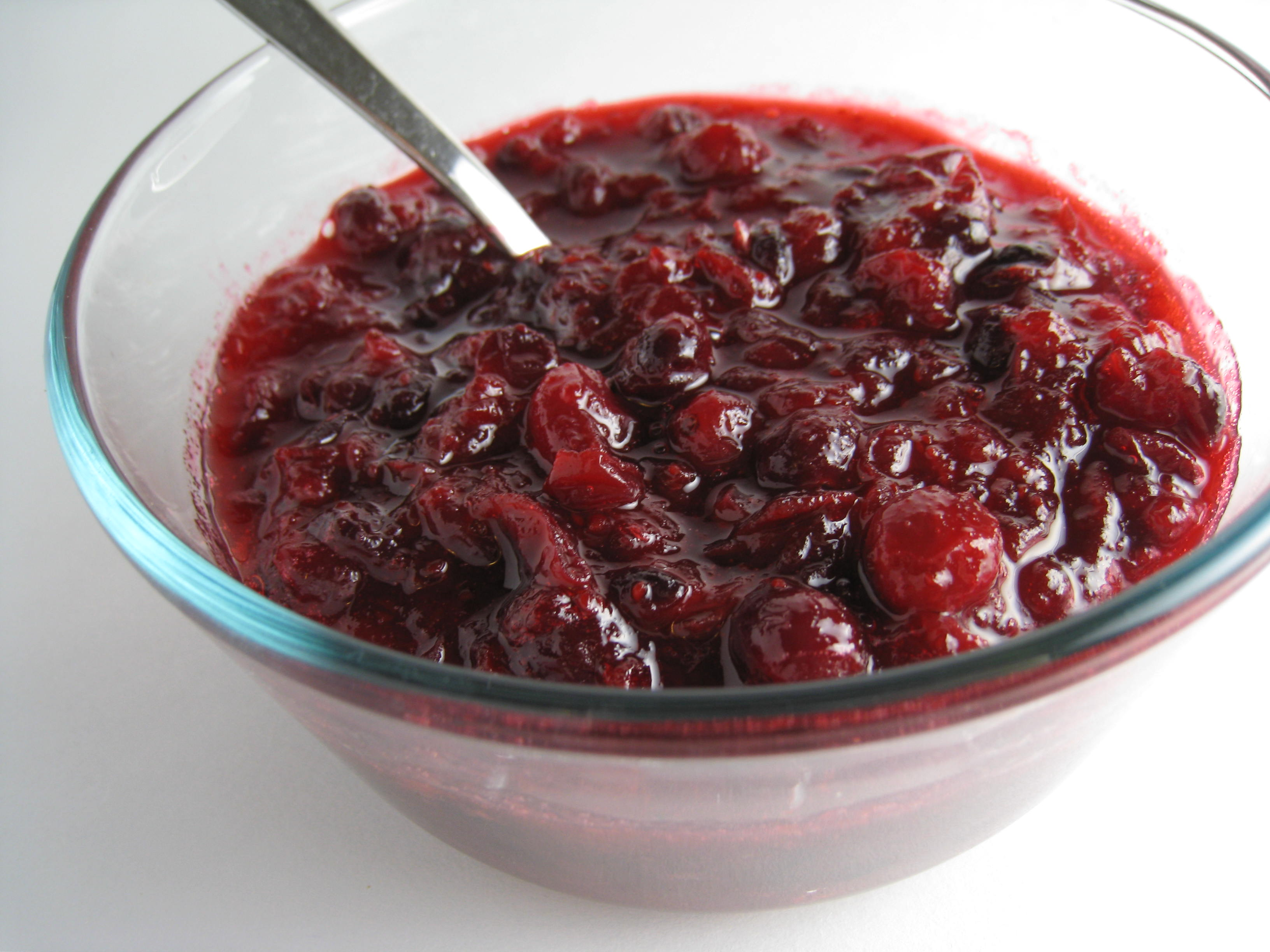
Cranberry sauce

New England maintains a distinct cuisine and food culture. Early foods in the region were influenced by Native American and English cuisines. The early colonists often adapted their original cuisine to fit with the available foods of the region. New England staples reflect the convergence of American Indian and Pilgrim cuisine, such as johnnycakes, succotash, cornbread and various seafood recipes. The Wabanaki tribal nations made nut milk.

New England also has a distinct food language. A few of the unique regional terms include "grinders" for submarine sandwiches and "frappes" for thick milkshakes, referred to as "Cabinets" in Rhode Island. Other foods native to the region include steak tips (marinated sirloin steak), bulkie rolls, maple syrup, cranberry recipes and clam chowder.

A type of India pale ale known as New England India Pale Ale (NEIPA) was developed in Vermont in the 2010s. Other regional beverages include Moxie, one of the first mass-produced soft drinks in the United States, introduced in Lowell, Massachusetts, in 1876; it remains popular in New England, particularly in Maine. Coffee milk is associated with Rhode Island as the official state drink.

Portuguese cuisine is an important element in the annual Feast of the Blessed Sacrament in New Bedford, Massachusetts, the largest ethnic heritage festival in New England.

=== Accents and dialects ===
There are several characteristics of spoken American English in the region, most famously the Boston accent, which is native to the northeastern coastal regions of New England. The most identifiable features of the Boston accent originated from England's Received Pronunciation, which shares features such as the broad A and dropping the final R. Another source was 17th century speech in East Anglia and Lincolnshire, where many of the Puritan immigrants had originated. The East Anglian "whine" developed into the Yankee "twang". Boston accents were most strongly associated at one point with the so-called "Eastern Establishment" and Boston's upper class, although today the accent is predominantly associated with blue-collar natives, as exemplified by movies such as Good Will Hunting and The Departed. The Boston accent and those accents closely related to it cover eastern Massachusetts, New Hampshire and Maine.

Some Rhode Islanders speak with a non-rhotic accent that many compare to a "Brooklyn" accent or a cross between a New York and Boston accent, where "water" becomes "wata". Many Rhode Islanders distinguish the aw sound [ɔː], as one might hear in New Jersey; e.g., the word "coffee" is pronounced /ˈkɔːfi/ KAW-fee. This type of accent was brought to the region by early settlers from eastern England in the Puritan migration in the mid-seventeenth century.

=== Social activities and music ===
Acadian and Québécois culture are included in music and dance in much of rural New England, particularly Maine. Contra dancing and country square dancing are popular throughout New England, usually backed by live Irish, Acadian or other folk music. Fife and drum corps are common, especially in southern New England and more specifically Connecticut, with music of mostly Celtic, English, and local origin. New England leads the U.S. in ice cream consumption per capita. Candlepin bowling is essentially confined to New England, where it was invented in the 19th century.

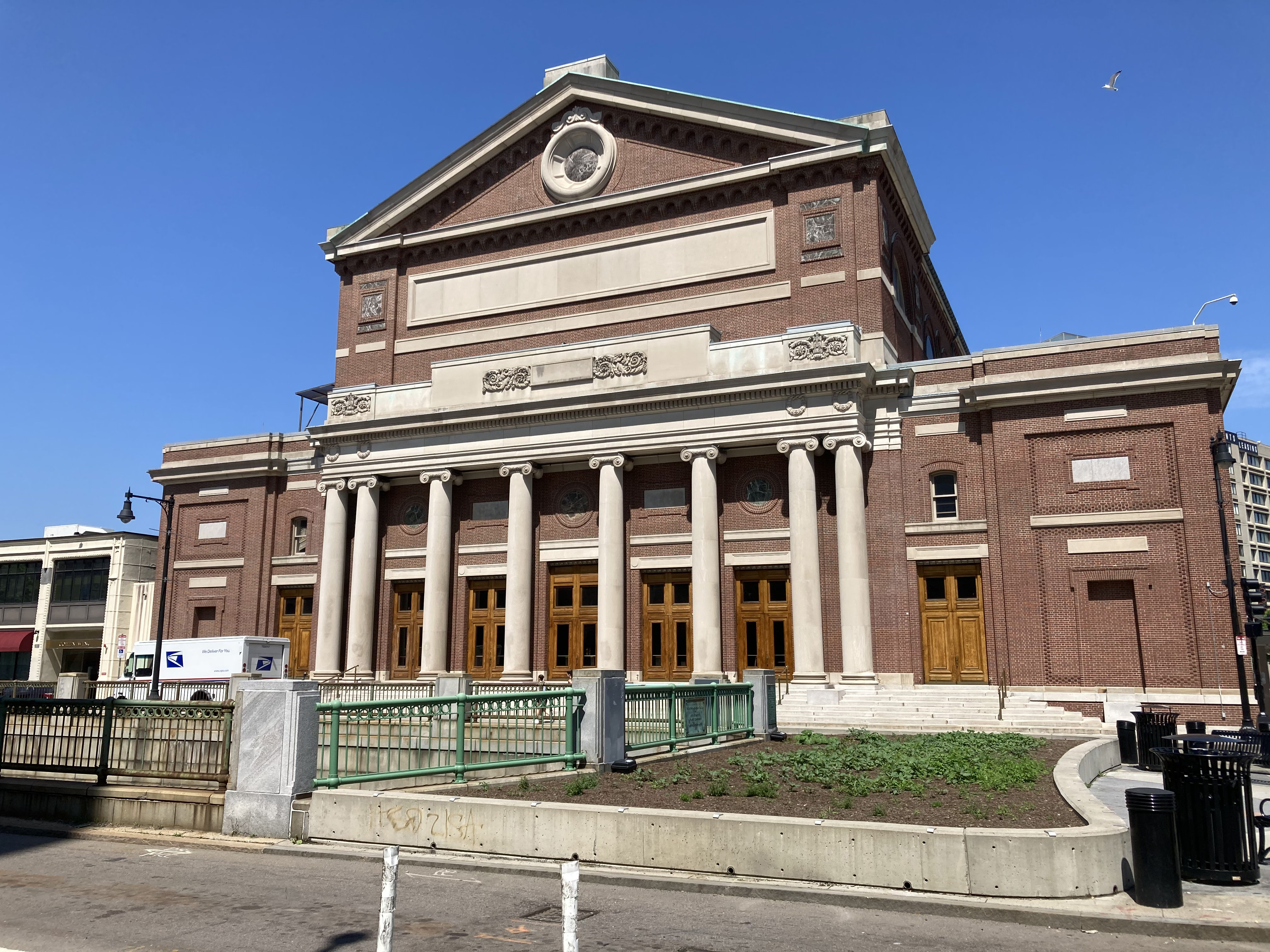
Boston's Symphony Hall is the home of the Boston Symphony Orchestra—the second-oldest of the Big Five American symphony orchestras.

New England was an important center of American classical music for some time. The First New England School of composers was active between 1770 and 1820, and the Second New England School about a century later. Prominent modernist composers also come from the region, including Charles Ives and John Adams. Boston is the site of the New England Conservatory, Boston Conservatory at Berklee, and the Boston Symphony Orchestra.

In popular music, the region has produced Donna Summer, JoJo, New Edition, Bobby Brown, Bel Biv Devoe, Passion Pit, MGMT, Meghan Trainor, New Kids on the Block, Rachel Platten, Clairo, Noah Kahan, Amy Allen and John Mayer. In rock music, the region has produced Rob Zombie, Aerosmith, Extreme, the Modern Lovers, Phish, the Pixies, the Cars, the J. Geils Band, the Mighty Mighty Bosstones, Grace Potter, GG Allin, the Dresden Dolls, Dinosaur Jr., the Dropkick Murphys and Boston. Quincy, Massachusetts, native Dick Dale helped popularize surf rock. Hip hop acts hailing from New England include Gang Starr, Apathy, Mr. Lif and Akrobatik.

=== Media ===
The leading U.S. cable TV sports broadcaster ESPN is headquartered in Bristol, Connecticut. New England has several regional cable networks, including New England Cable News (NECN) and the New England Sports Network (NESN). New England Cable News is the largest regional 24-hour cable news network in the U.S., broadcasting to more than 3.2 million homes in all of the New England states. Its studios are located in Newton, Massachusetts, outside of Boston, and it maintains bureaus in Manchester, New Hampshire; Hartford, Connecticut; Worcester, Massachusetts; Portland, Maine; and Burlington, Vermont. In Connecticut's Litchfield, Fairfield, and New Haven counties, it also broadcasts New York based news programs—this is due in part to the immense influence New York has on this region's economy and culture, and also to give Connecticut broadcasters the ability to compete with overlapping media coverage from New York-area broadcasters.

NESN broadcasts the Boston Red Sox baseball and Boston Bruins hockey throughout the region, save for Fairfield County, Connecticut. Connecticut also receives the YES Network, which broadcasts the games of the New York Yankees and Brooklyn Nets as well as SportsNet New York (SNY), which broadcasts New York Mets games.

NBC Sports Boston broadcasts the games of the Boston Celtics, New England Revolution and Boston Cannons to all of New England except Fairfield County. While most New England cities have daily newspapers, The Boston Globe and The New York Times are distributed widely throughout the region. Major newspapers also include The Providence Journal, Portland Press Herald, and Hartford Courant, the oldest continuously published newspaper in the U.S.

==== Comedy ====
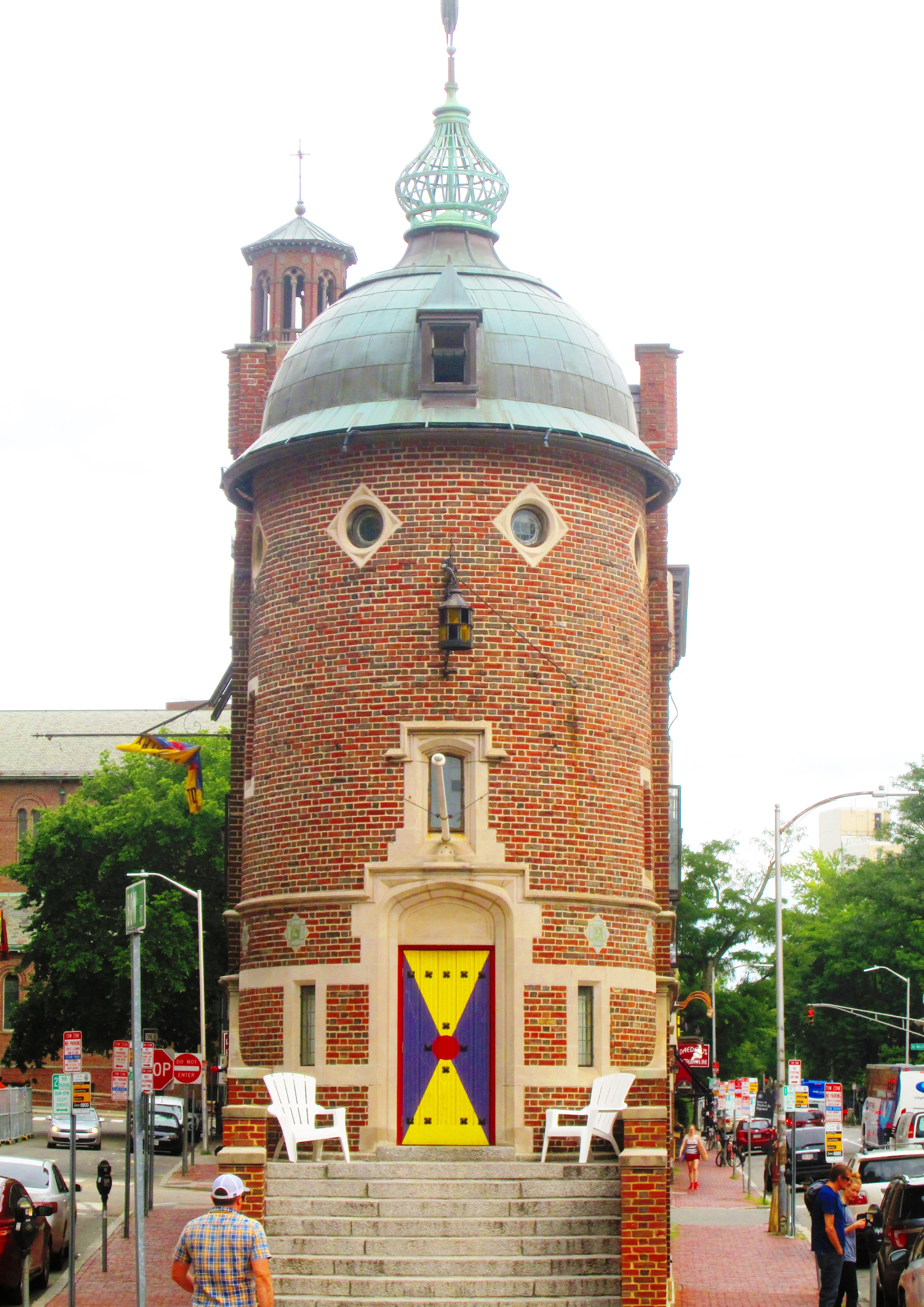
Lampoon Castle in Cambridge, Massachusetts, the headquarters for the Harvard Lampoon

New Englanders are well represented in American comedy. Writers for The Simpsons and late-night television programs often come by way of The Harvard Lampoon. A number of Saturday Night Live (SNL) cast members have roots in New England, from Adam Sandler to Amy Poehler, who also starred in the NBC television series Parks and Recreation. Seth MacFarlane, the creator of Family Guy, is from Connecticut, with the show taking place in a fictional town called Quahog, Rhode Island. Former Daily Show correspondents John Hodgman, Rob Corddry and Steve Carell are from Massachusetts. Carell was also involved in film and the American adaptation of The Office (alongside fellow Massachusetts natives Mindy Kaling, B. J. Novak, and John Krasinski), which features Dunder-Mifflin branches set in Stamford, Connecticut, and Nashua, New Hampshire.

Late-night television hosts Jay Leno and Conan O'Brien have roots in the Boston area. Notable stand-up comedians are also from the region, including Bill Burr, Steve Sweeney, Steven Wright, Sarah Silverman, Lisa Lampanelli, Denis Leary, Lenny Clarke, Patrice O'Neal and Louis CK. SNL cast member Seth Meyers once attributed the region's imprint on American humor to its "sort of wry New England sense of pointing out anyone who's trying to make a big deal of himself", with The Boston Globe suggesting that irony and sarcasm are its trademarks, as well as Irish influences.

=== Literature ===
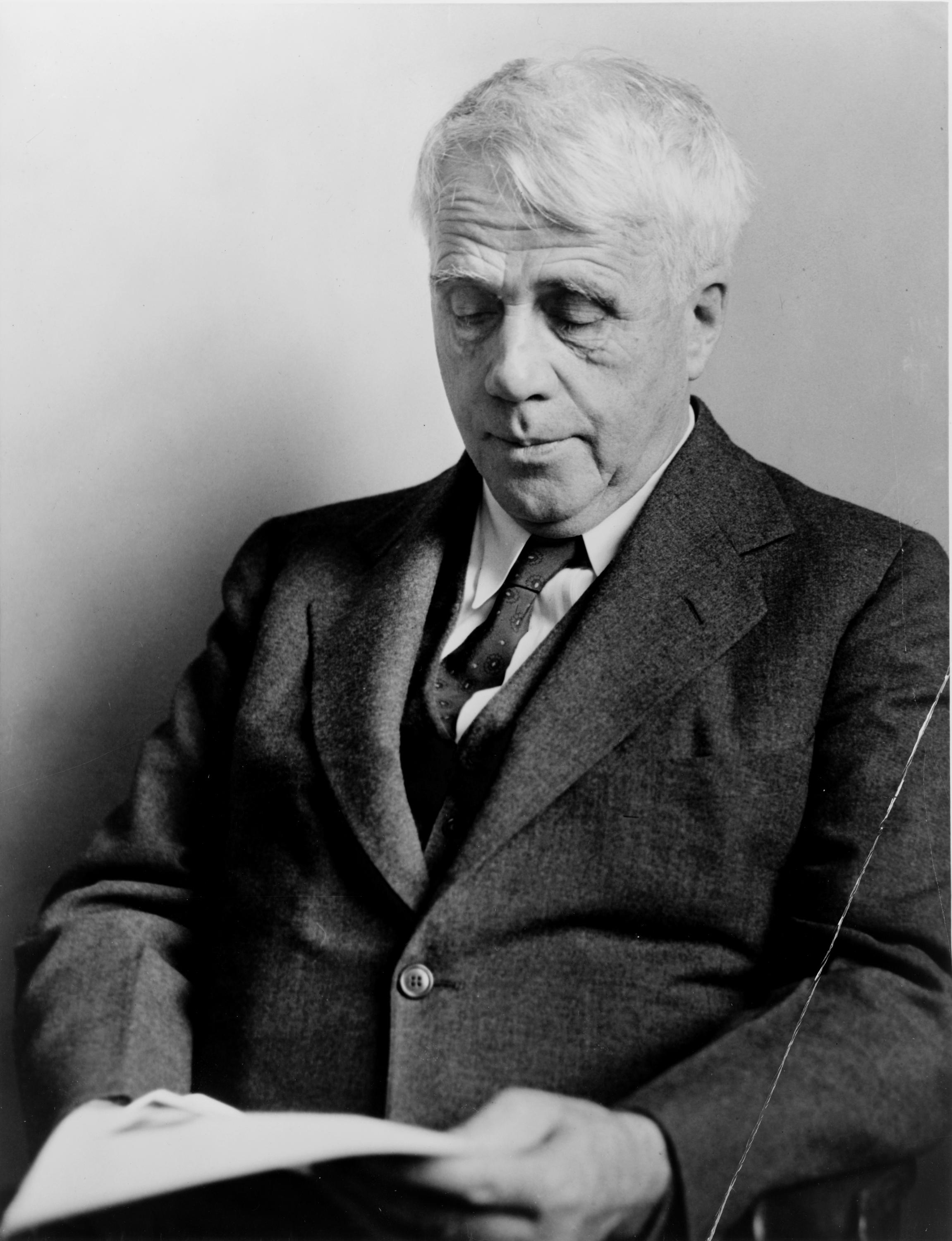
New England regionalist poet Robert Frost

New Englanders have made significant contributions to literature. The first printing press in America was set up in Cambridge, Massachusetts, by Stephen Daye in the 17th century. Writers in New England produced many works on religious subjects, particularly on Puritan theology and poetry during colonial times and on Enlightenment ideas during the American Revolution. The literature of New England has had an enduring influence on American literature in general, with themes that are emblematic of the larger concerns of American letters, such as religion, race, the individual versus society, social repression and nature.

19th century New England was a center for progressive ideals, and many abolitionist and transcendentalist tracts were produced. Leading transcendentalists were from New England, such as Henry David Thoreau, Ralph Waldo Emerson, and Frederic Henry Hedge. Hartford, Connecticut resident Harriet Beecher Stowe's novel Uncle Tom's Cabin was an influential book in the spread of abolitionist ideas and is said to have "laid the groundwork for the Civil War". Other prominent New England novelists include John Irving, Edgar Allan Poe, Louisa May Alcott, Sarah Orne Jewett, H. P. Lovecraft, Annie Proulx, Stephen King, Jack Kerouac, George V. Higgins, and Nathaniel Hawthorne.

Boston was the center of the American publishing industry for some years, largely on the strength of its local writers and before it was overtaken by New York in the middle of the nineteenth century. Boston remains the home of publishers Houghton Mifflin and Pearson Education, and it was the longtime home of literary magazine The Atlantic Monthly. Merriam-Webster is based in Springfield, Massachusetts. Yankee is a magazine for New Englanders based in Dublin, New Hampshire.

Many New Englander poets have also been preeminent in American poetry. Prominent poets include Henry Wadsworth Longfellow, David Lindsay-Abaire, Annie Proulx, Edwin Arlington Robinson, Amy Lowell, John Cheever, Emily Dickinson, Elizabeth Bishop, Stanley Kunitz, E. E. Cummings, Edna St. Vincent Millay, Robert P. T. Coffin and Richard Wilbur. Robert Frost who was described as an "artistic institution" frequently wrote about rural New England life. The Confessional poetry movement features prominent New England writers including Robert Lowell, Anne Sexton and Sylvia Plath.

=== Film, television, and acting ===
New England has a rich history in filmmaking dating back to the dawn of the motion picture era at the turn of the 20th century, sometimes dubbed Hollywood East by film critics. A theater at 547 Washington Street in Boston was the second location to debut a picture projected by the Vitascope, and shortly thereafter several novels were being adapted for the screen and set in New England, including The Scarlet Letter and The House of Seven Gables. The New England region continued to churn out films at a pace above the national average for the duration of the 20th century, including blockbuster hits such as Jaws, Good Will Hunting and The Departed, all of which won Academy Awards.

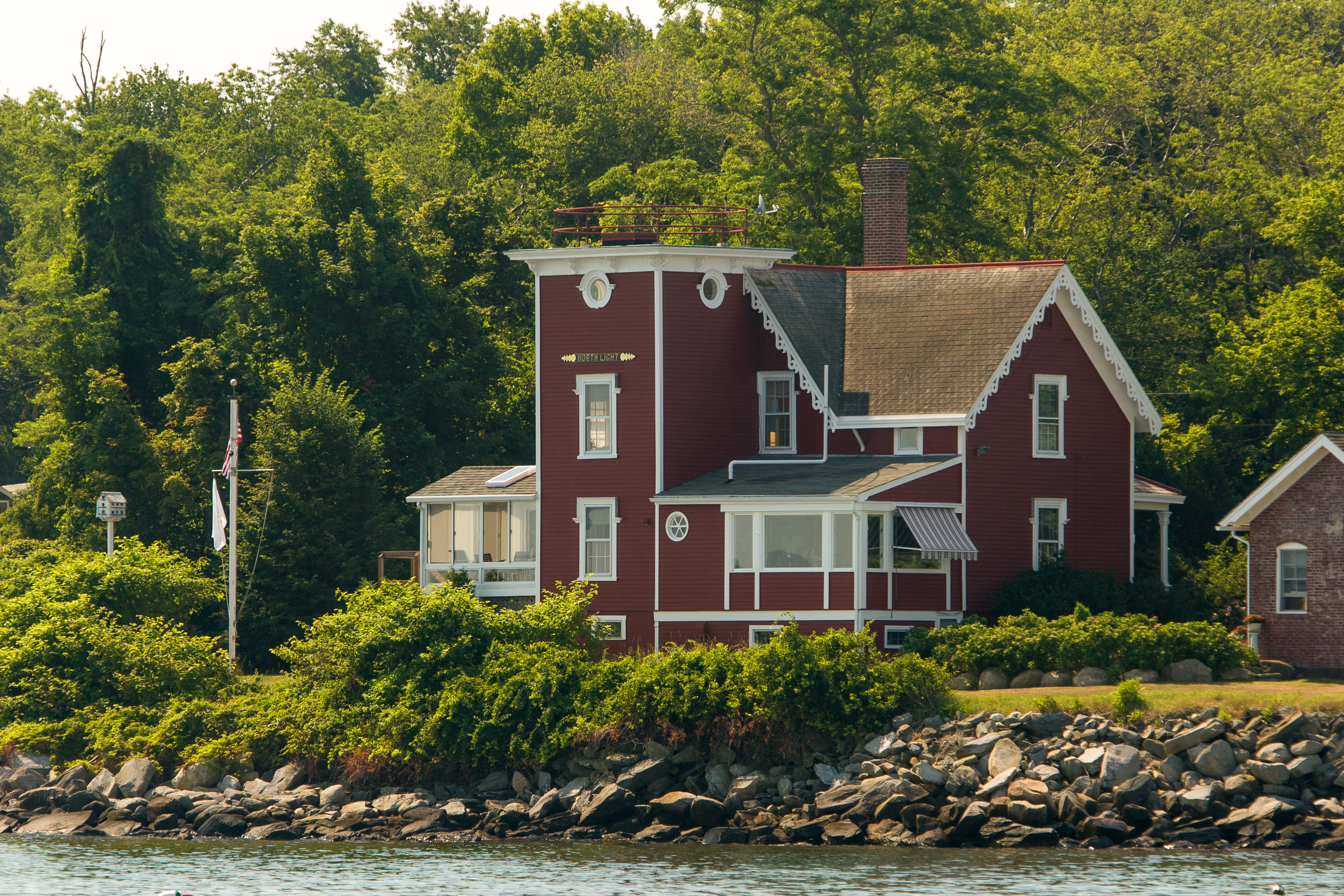
Wes Anderson's Moonrise Kingdom is set on a fictional New England island and was largely filmed in Rhode Island

The New England area became known for a number of themes that recurred in films made during this era, including the development of yankee characters, small town life contrasted with city values, seafaring tales, family secrets and haunted New England. These themes are rooted in centuries of New England culture and are complemented by the region's diverse natural landscape and architecture, from the Atlantic Ocean and brilliant fall foliage to church steeples and skyscrapers.

Since the turn of the millennium, Boston and the greater New England region have been home to the production of numerous films and television series, thanks in part to tax incentive programs put in place by local governments to attract filmmakers to the region.

Notable actors and actresses that have come from the New England area include Ben Affleck, Matt Damon, Chris Evans, Ryan O'Neal, Amy Poehler, Elizabeth Banks, Steve Carell, Ruth Gordon, John Krasinski, Edward Norton, Mark Wahlberg and Matthew Perry. Many films and television series have been produced in and set in New England.

=== Museums, historical societies, and libraries ===
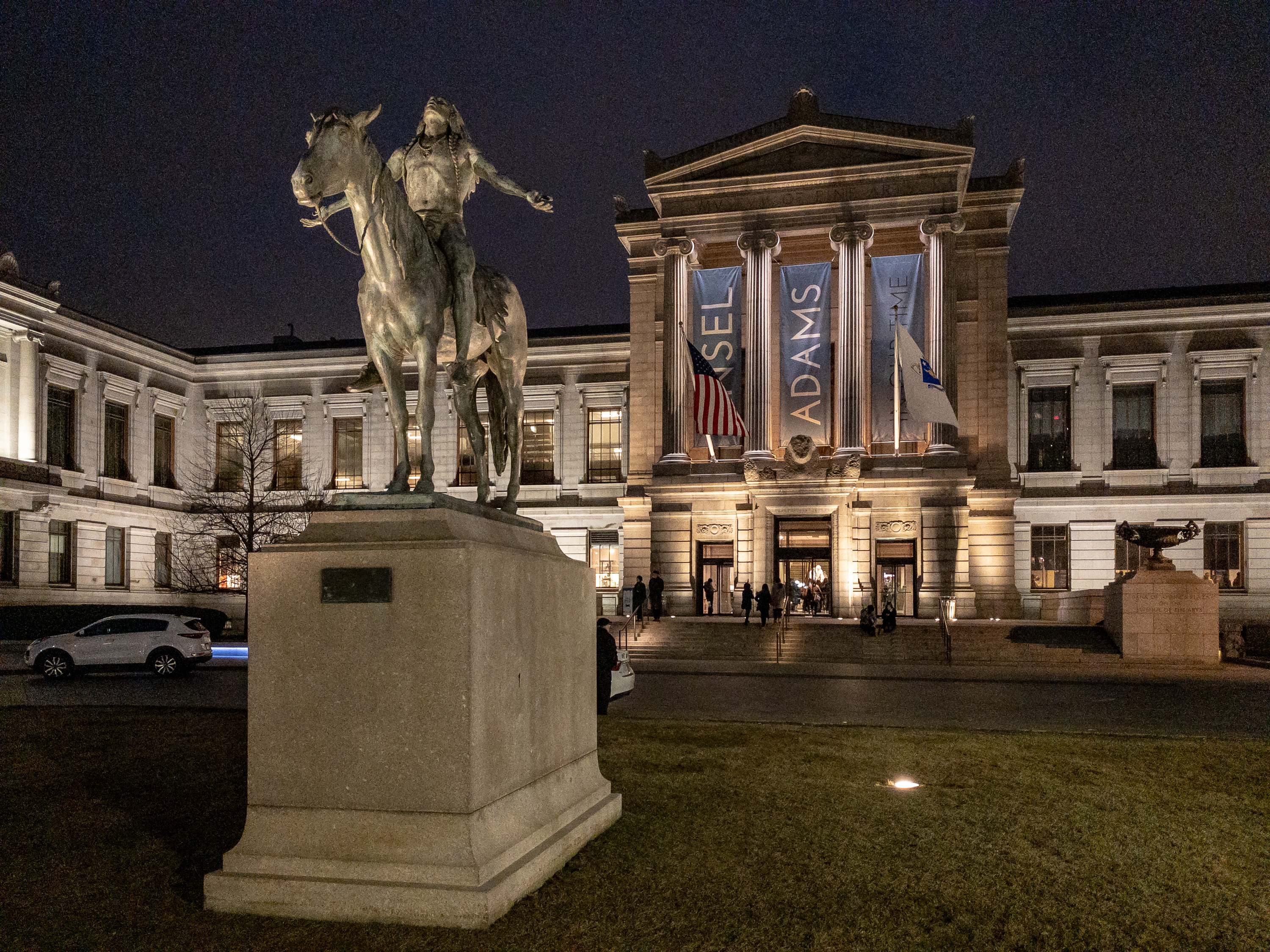
Museum of Fine Arts, Boston

There are many museums located throughout New England, especially in the Greater Boston area. These museums include privately held collections as well as public institutions. Most notable of these museums are the Museum of Fine Arts, the Institute of Contemporary Art, Boston, the Isabella Stewart Gardner Museum, Worcester Art Museum, and the Peabody Essex Museum. The oldest public museum in continuous operation in the United States is the Pilgrim Hall Museum in Plymouth, Massachusetts, which opened in 1824.

The Boston Public Library is the largest public library in the region with over 8 million materials in its collection. The largest academic research library in the world is the Harvard Library in Cambridge, Massachusetts. The W. E. B. Du Bois Library of the University of Massachusetts Amherst is the tallest academic library in the world.

There are also many historical societies in the region. Historic New England operates museums and historic sites in the name of historical preservation. Many properties belonging to HNE include preserved house museums of prominent figures in New England and American history. Other societies include the Massachusetts Historical Society, the Essex Institute, the American Antiquarian Society, and The Bostonian Society. The Massachusetts Historical Society, founded in 1791, is the oldest operating in the United States. Many cities and towns across New England operate their own historical societies focused on historical preservation of local sites and the recording of local history.

=== Sports ===
New England has a strong heritage of athletics, and many internationally popular sports were invented and codified in the region, including basketball, volleyball, and American football.

Football is the most popular sport in the region and was developed by Walter Camp in New Haven, Connecticut, in the 1870s and 1880s. The New England Patriots are based in Foxborough, Massachusetts, and are the most popular professional sports team in New England. The Patriots have won six Super Bowl championships and are one of the most winning teams in the National Football League. There are also high-profile collegiate and high school football rivalries in New England. These games are most often played on Thanksgiving Day and are some of the oldest sports rivalries in the United States. The high school rivalry between Wellesley High School and Needham High School in Massachusetts is considered to be the nation's oldest football rivalry, having started in 1882.

Before the advent of modern rules of baseball, a different form was played called the Massachusetts Game. This version of baseball was an early rival of the Knickerbocker Rules of New York and was played throughout New England. In 1869, there were 59 teams throughout the region which played according to the Massachusetts rules. The New York rules gradually became more popular throughout the United States, and professional and semi-professional clubs began to appear. Early teams included the Providence Grays, the Worcester Worcesters and the Hartford Dark Blues; these did not last long, but other teams grew to renown, such as the Boston Braves and the Boston Red Sox. Fenway Park was built in 1912 and is the oldest ballpark still in use in Major League Baseball. The Red Sox have won the World Series nine times, tied for third-most among all MLB teams. Other professional baseball teams in the region include the Hartford Yard Goats, New Hampshire Fisher Cats, Vermont Lake Monsters, Portland Sea Dogs, Bridgeport Bluefish, New Britain Bees and the Worcester Red Sox.

Basketball was developed in Springfield, Massachusetts, by James Naismith in 1891. Naismith was attempting to create a game which could be played indoors so that athletes could keep fit during New England winters. The Boston Celtics were founded in 1946 and are the most successful NBA team, winning 18 titles. The Celtics' NBA G League team, the Maine Celtics, is based in Portland, Maine. The Women's National Basketball Association's Connecticut Sun is based in Uncasville, Connecticut. The UConn Huskies women's basketball team is the most successful women's collegiate team in the nation, winning 11 NCAA Division I titles, and the UConn Huskies men's basketball team has won six titles, tied for third-most in the nation. The Basketball Hall of Fame is located in Springfield, Massachusetts.

Winter sports are extremely popular and have a long history in the region, including alpine skiing, snowboarding, and Nordic skiing. Ice hockey is also a popular sport. The Boston Bruins were founded in 1924 as an Original Six team, and they have a historic rivalry with the Montreal Canadiens. The Bruins play in the TD Garden, a venue that they share with the Boston Celtics. The Boston Fleet of the Professional Women's Hockey League (PWHL) plays at Tsongas Center. College hockey is also a popular spectator sport, with Boston's annual Beanpot tournament between Northeastern University, Boston University, Harvard University and Boston College. Other hockey teams include the Maine Mariners, Providence Bruins, Springfield Thunderbirds, Worcester Railers, Bridgeport Sound Tigers and the Hartford Wolf Pack. The region's largest ice hockey and skating facility is the New England Sports Center in Marlborough, Massachusetts, home to the Skating Club of Boston, one of the oldest ice skating clubs in the United States.

Volleyball was invented in Holyoke, Massachusetts, in 1895 by William G. Morgan. Morgan was an instructor at a YMCA and wanted to create an indoor game for his athletes. The game was based on badminton and was spread as a sport through YMCA facilities. The international Volleyball Hall of Fame is located in Holyoke.

Rowing, sailing, and yacht racing are also popular events in New England. The Head of the Charles race is held on the Charles River in October every year and attracts over 10,000 athletes and over 200,000 spectators each year. Sailing regattas include the Newport Bermuda Race, the Marblehead to Halifax Ocean Race, and the Single-Handed Trans-Atlantic Race. The New York Times considers the Newport and Marblehead races to be among the most prestigious in the world.

The Boston Marathon is run on Patriots' Day every year and was first run in 1897. It is a World Marathon Major and is operated by the Boston Athletic Association. The race route goes from Hopkinton, Massachusetts, through Greater Boston, finishing at Copley Square in Boston. The race offers far less prize money than many other marathons, but its difficulty and long history make it one of the world's most prestigious marathons. It is New England's largest sporting event with nearly 500,000 spectators each year.

New England is represented in the top level of American professional soccer by the New England Revolution, an inaugural team of the Major League Soccer founded in 1994 and playing in Gillette Stadium which it shares with the New England Patriots. The Revolution have won a U.S. Open Cup and a SuperLiga Championship, and they have appeared in five MLS finals. In the USL Championship, the second division on the American soccer pyramid, New England is represented by Hartford Athletic which was founded in 2019 and plays its games at Dillon Stadium, and Rhode Island FC, which began play in 2024.

The International Tennis Hall of Fame is in Newport, Rhode Island.

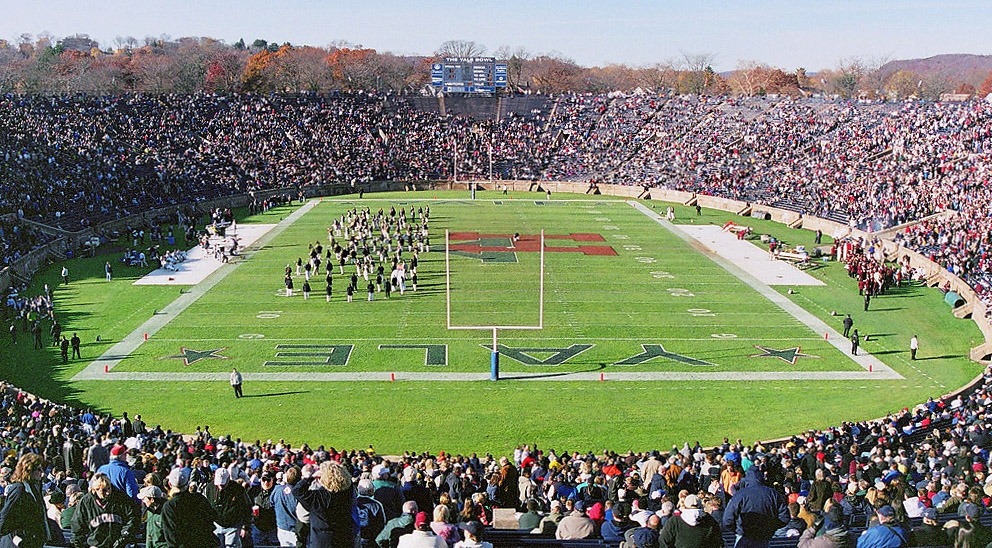
Harvard vs. Yale football game in 2003

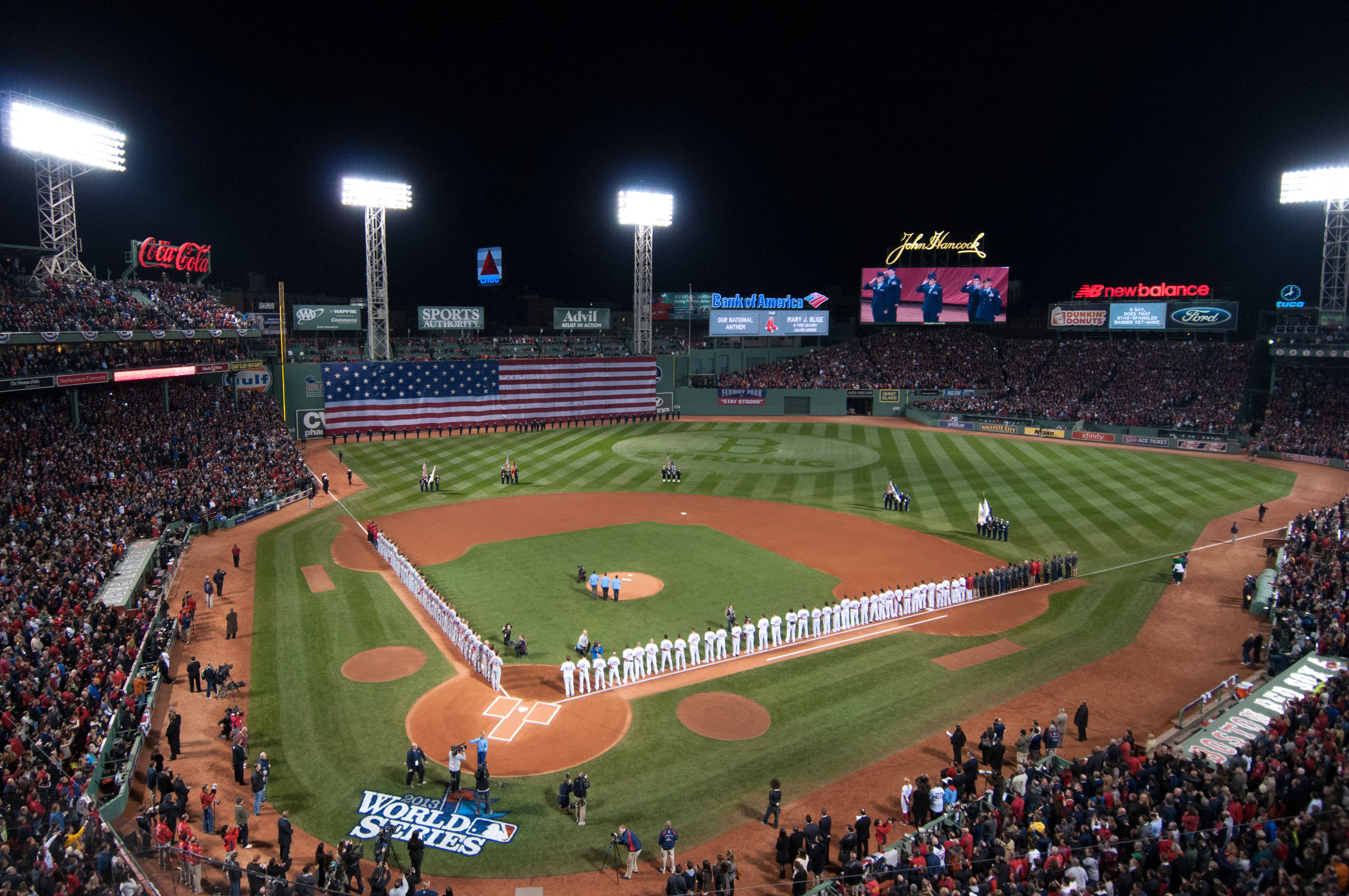
Fenway Park

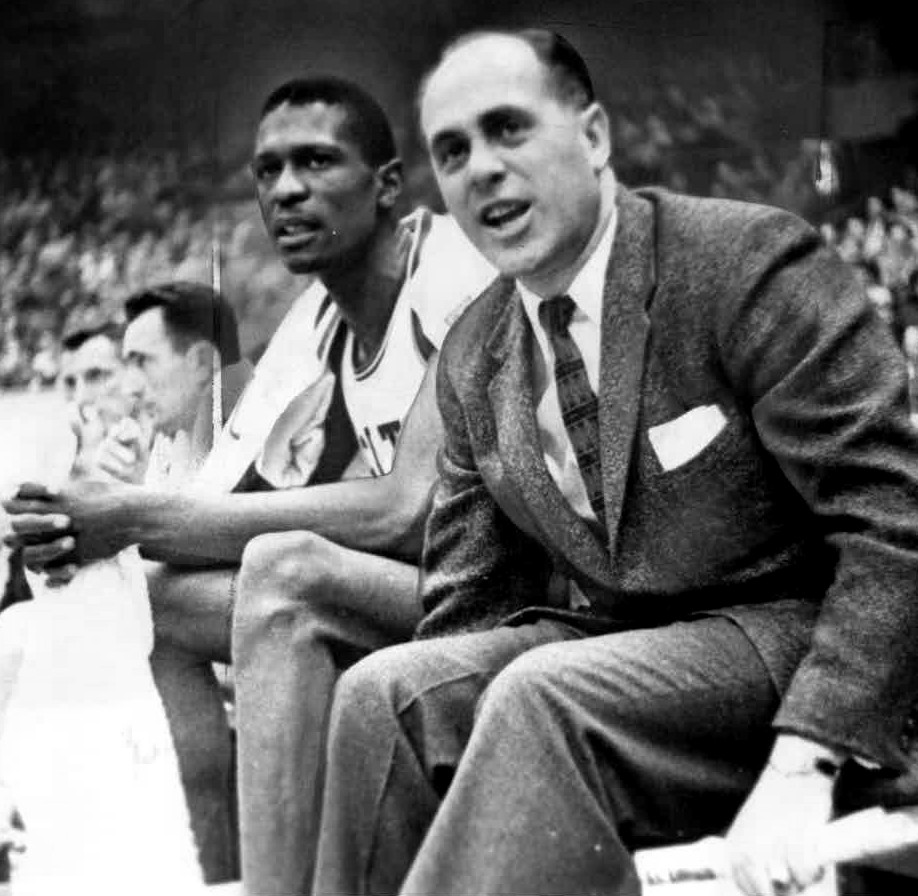
Bill Russell and Red Auerbach of the Boston Celtics

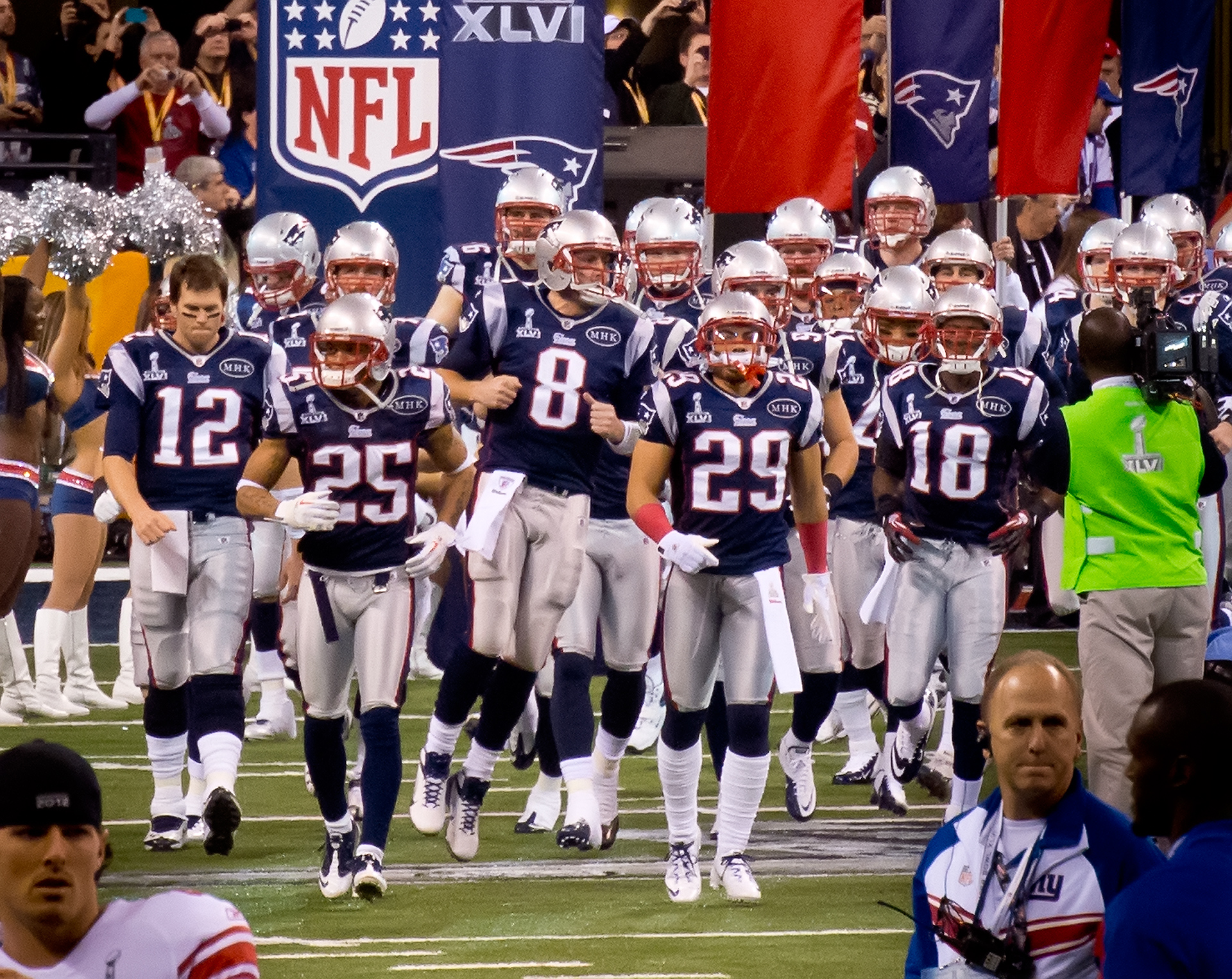
The New England Patriots are the most popular professional sports team in New England.

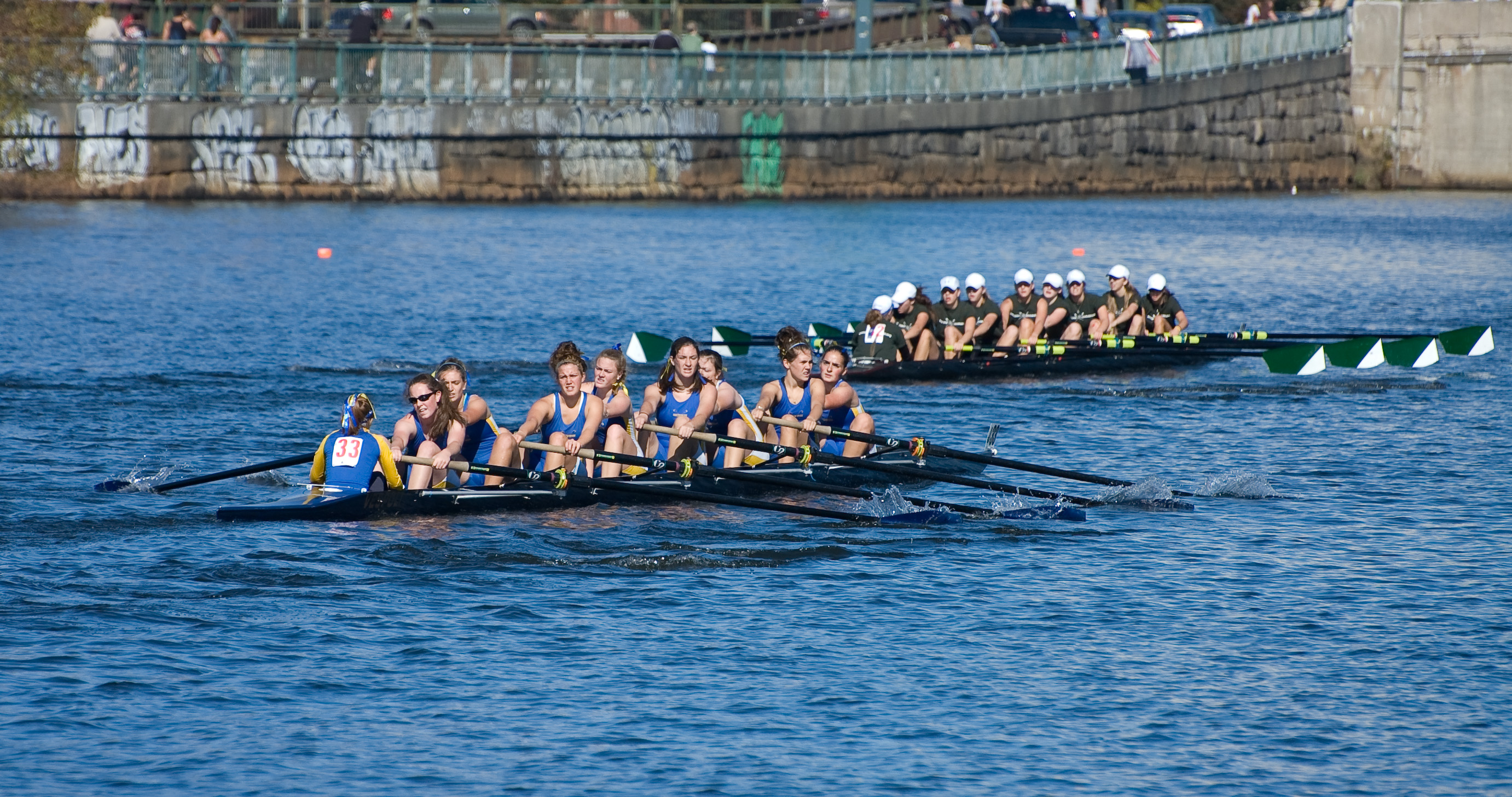
The Middlebury College rowing team in the 2007 Head of the Charles Regatta

== Transportation ==
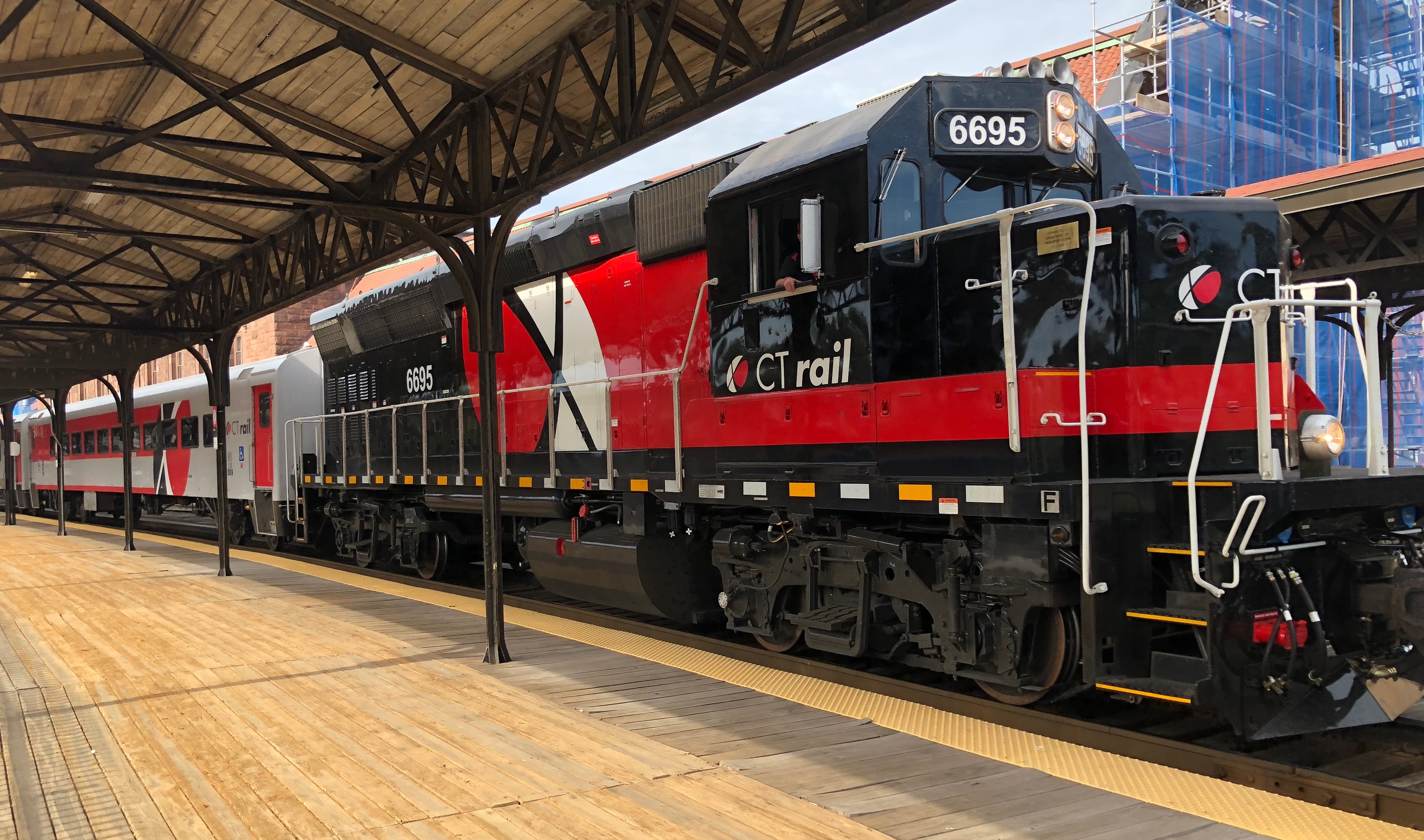
A Hartford Line train at Hartford Union Station

The MBTA Commuter Rail serves eastern Massachusetts and parts of Rhode Island, radiating from downtown Boston, with planned service to New Hampshire. The CTrail system operates the Shore Line East and Hartford Line, covering coastal Connecticut, Hartford, and Springfield, Massachusetts.

Each of the New England states has its own Department of Transportation which plans and develops systems for transport, though some transportation authorities operate across state and municipal lines. The Massachusetts Bay Transportation Authority (MBTA) oversees public transportation in the Greater Boston area. It is the largest such agency and operates throughout eastern Massachusetts and into Rhode Island. The MBTA oversees the oldest subway system (the Tremont Street subway) and the second most-used light rail line (the Green Line) in the United States, as well as one of five remaining trolleybus systems nationwide. Coastal Connecticut makes use of the Metropolitan Transportation Authority of New York due to the connection of that region to New York's economy. The MTA operates the Metro-North Railroad in coordination with the Connecticut Department of Transportation. CTrail is a division of the Connecticut Department of Transportation which operates the Shore Line East along its southern coast, terminating in Old Saybrook and New London. It also operates the Hartford Line, leading south to New Haven and north to Springfield. Commuter rail service is provided north of Springfield to Greenfield, Massachusetts, as part of the Valley Flyer Amtrak route.

Amtrak provides interstate rail service throughout New England. Boston is the northern terminus of the Northeast Corridor. The Vermonter connects Vermont to Massachusetts and Connecticut, while the Downeaster links Maine to Boston. The long-distance Lake Shore Limited train has two eastern termini after splitting in Albany, one of which is Boston. This provides rail service on the former Boston and Albany Railroad which runs between its namesake cities. The rest of the Lake Shore Limited continues to New York City.

Bus transportation is available in most urban areas and is governed by regional and local authorities. The Pioneer Valley Transit Authority and the MetroWest Regional Transit Authority are examples of public bus transportation which support more suburban and rural communities.

South Station in Boston is a major center for bus, rail, and light rail lines. Major interstate highways traversing the region include I-95, I-93, I-91, I-89, I-84, and I-90 (the Massachusetts Turnpike). Logan Airport is the busiest transportation hub in the region in terms of number of passengers and total cargo, opened in 1923 and located in East Boston and Winthrop, Massachusetts. It is a hub for Cape Air and Delta Air Lines, and a focus city for JetBlue. It is the 16th busiest airport in the United States. Other airports in the region include Patrick Leahy Burlington International Airport, Bradley International Airport, Rhode Island T. F. Green International Airport, Manchester–Boston Regional Airport, and Portland International Jetport.

== See also ==
- List of online encyclopedias of U.S. states
- Atlantic Northeast
- Autumn in New England
- Brother Jonathan
- Extreme points of New England
- Fieldstone
- Historic New England
- List of beaches in New England
- List of birds of New England
- List of mammals of New England
- List of people from New England
- New Albion
- New Albion (colony)
- New England–Acadian forests
- New England Confederation
- New England (medieval)
- New England Planters
- New England Summer Nationals
- Northeastern coastal forests
- Offshore wind power
- Southeastern New England AVA wine region
