= Reef heron =

Reef heron could refer to:

- Western reef heron (Egretta gularis)
- Pacific reef heron (Egretta sacra)
