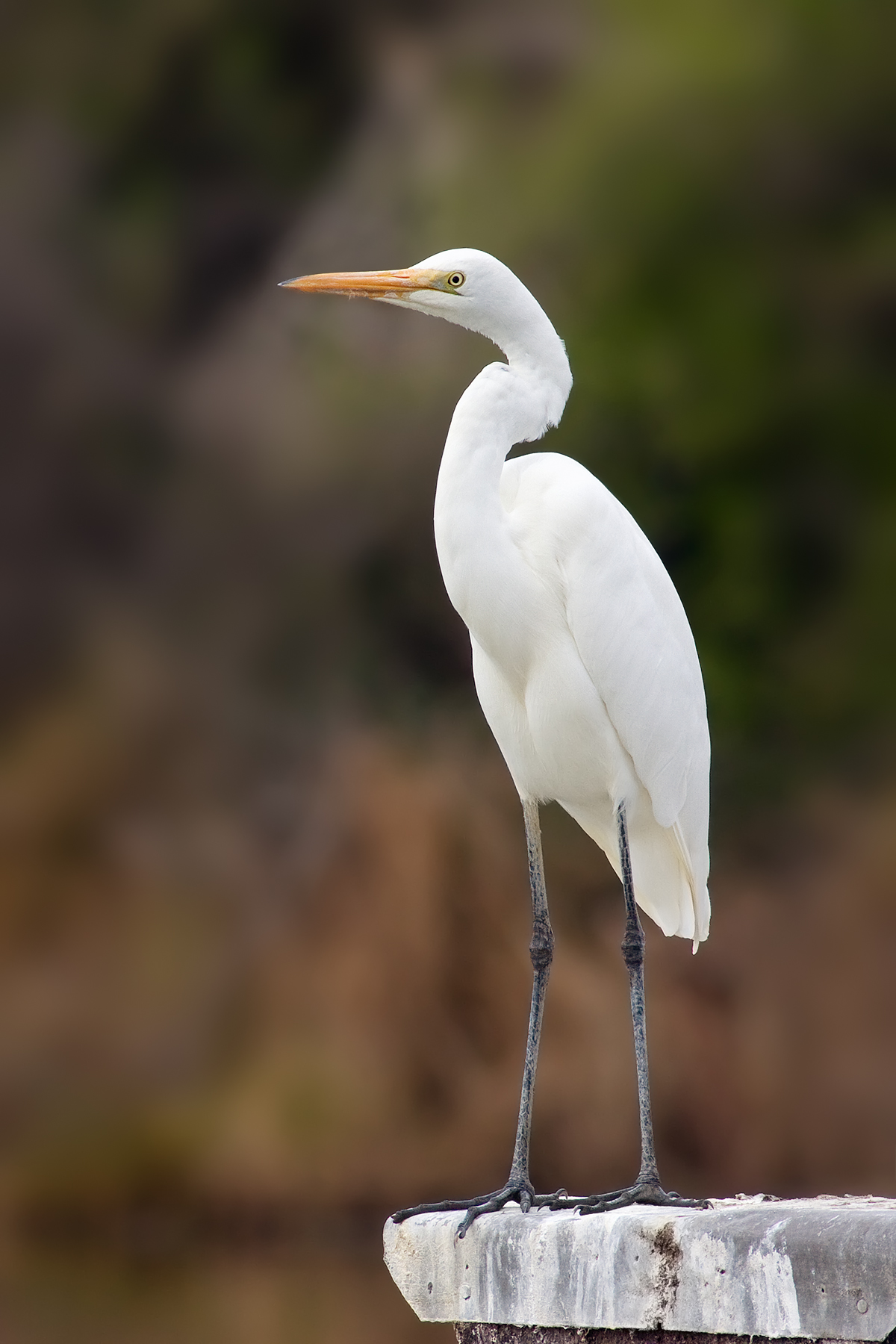
- Eastern great egret (Ardea alba modesta)

Scientific classification
- Kingdom: Animalia
- Phylum: Chordata
- Class: Aves
- Order: Pelecaniformes
- Family: Ardeidae
- Subfamily: Ardeinae

Groups included
- Egretta; Ardea; Bubulcus; Mesophoyx

Cladistically included but traditionally excluded taxa
- Nycticorax; Nyctanassa; Gorsachius; Butorides; Agamia; Pilherodius; Ardeola; Syrigma

= Egret =

Type of bird of the heron family

An egret (/ˈiː.ɡrət/, EE-grət) is a type of heron; they are generally long-legged wading birds that have white or buff plumage and develop fine plumes (usually milky white) during the breeding season. Egrets are not a biologically distinct group from herons and have the same build.

== Biology ==
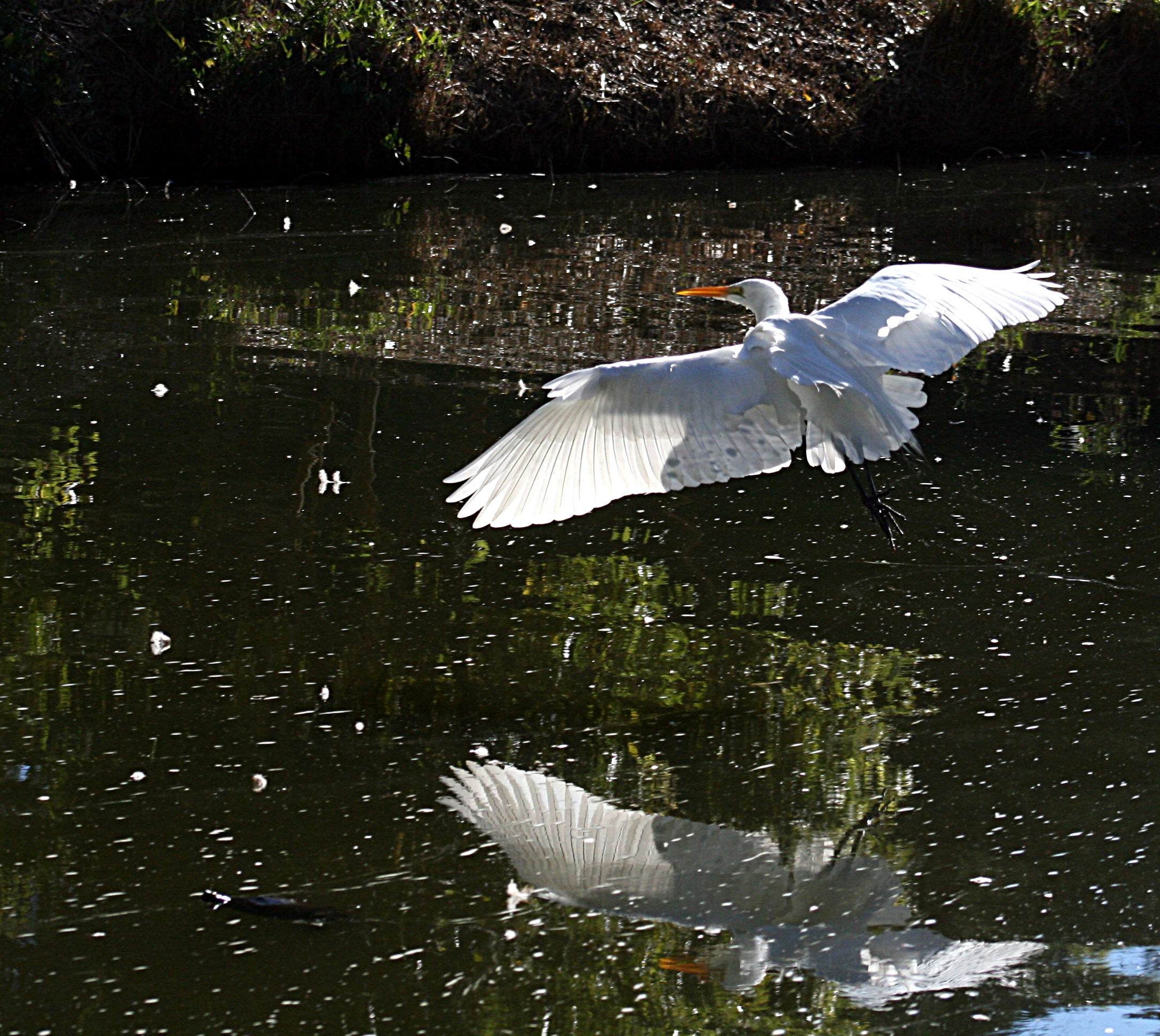
Great egret in flight

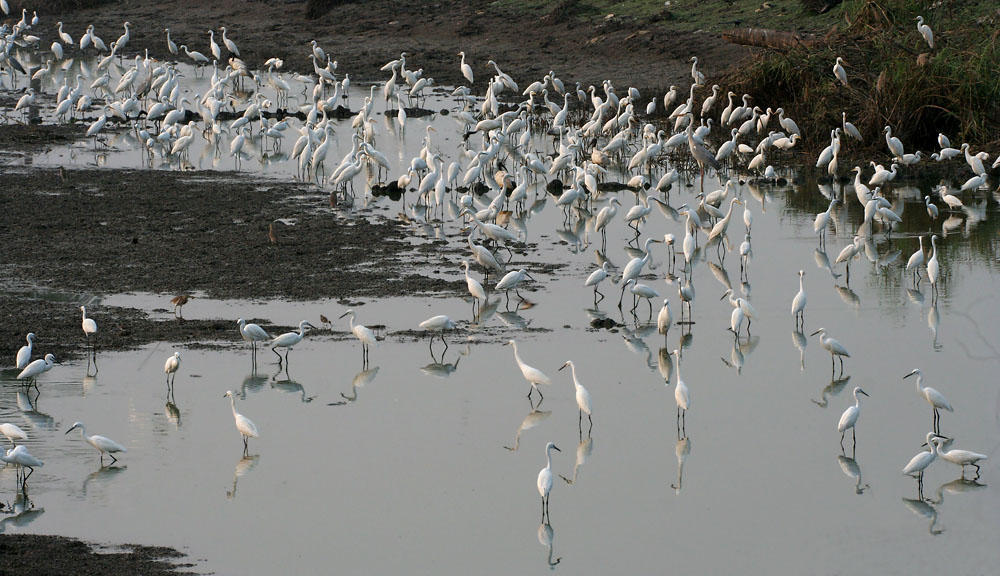
Egrets at dusk in Kolleru Lake, Andhra Pradesh, India

A great egret in the Yolo Bypass Wildlife Area, California

Egrets hold a separate group with bitterns and herons within the 74 species found in the bird family Ardeidae. Many egrets are members of the genera Egretta or Ardea, which also contain other species named as herons rather than egrets. The distinction between a heron and an egret is rather vague, and depends more on appearance than biology. The word "egret" comes from the French word aigrette that means both "silver heron" and "brush", referring to the long, filamentous feathers that seem to cascade down an egret's back during the breeding season (also called "egrets").

Several of the egrets have been reclassified from one genus to another in recent years; the great egret, for example, has been classified as a member of either Casmerodius, Egretta, or Ardea.

In the 19th and early part of the 20th centuries, some of the world's egret species were endangered by relentless plume hunting, since hat makers in Europe and the United States demanded large numbers of egret plumes, leading to breeding birds being killed in many places around the world.

Several Egretta species, including the eastern reef egret, the reddish egret, and the western reef egret, have two distinct colours, one of which is just white. The little blue heron has all-white juvenile plumage.

== Species in taxonomic order ==
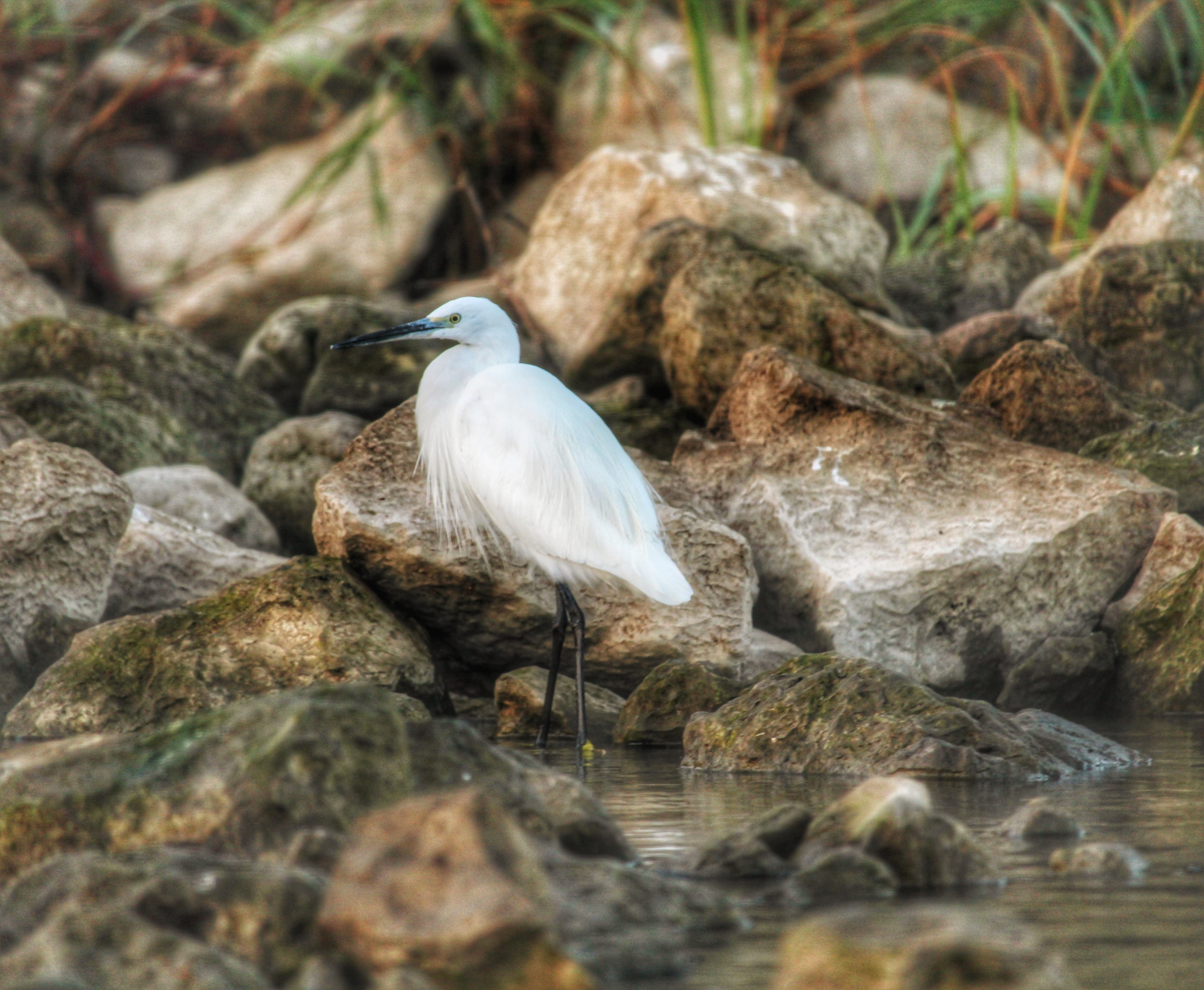
A little egret from Egypt

- Great egret or great white egret, Ardea alba
- Intermediate egret, Mesophoyx intermedia
- Western cattle egret, Ardea ibis
- Little egret, Egretta garzetta
- Snowy egret, Egretta thula
- Reddish egret, Egretta rufescens
- Slaty egret, Egretta vinaceigula
- Black egret, Egretta ardesiaca
- Chinese egret, Egretta eulophotes
- Eastern cattle egret, Ardea coromanda

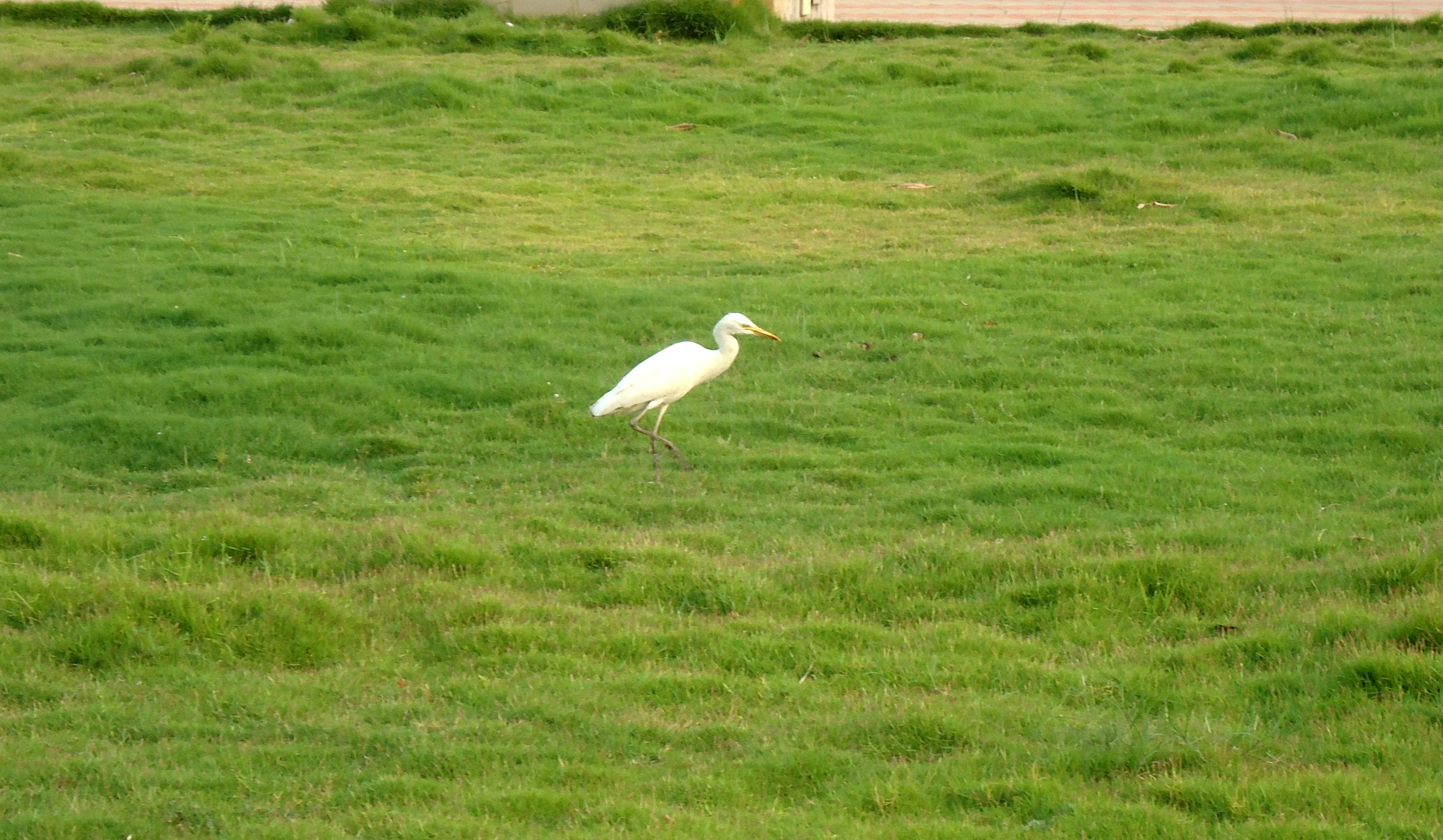
Egret at Palakkad, India

== Habitat ==
Egrets inhabit all continents except Antarctica; although they typically avoid the coldest regions, arid deserts, and very high mountains. They hunt and live in both saltwater and freshwater marshes.
