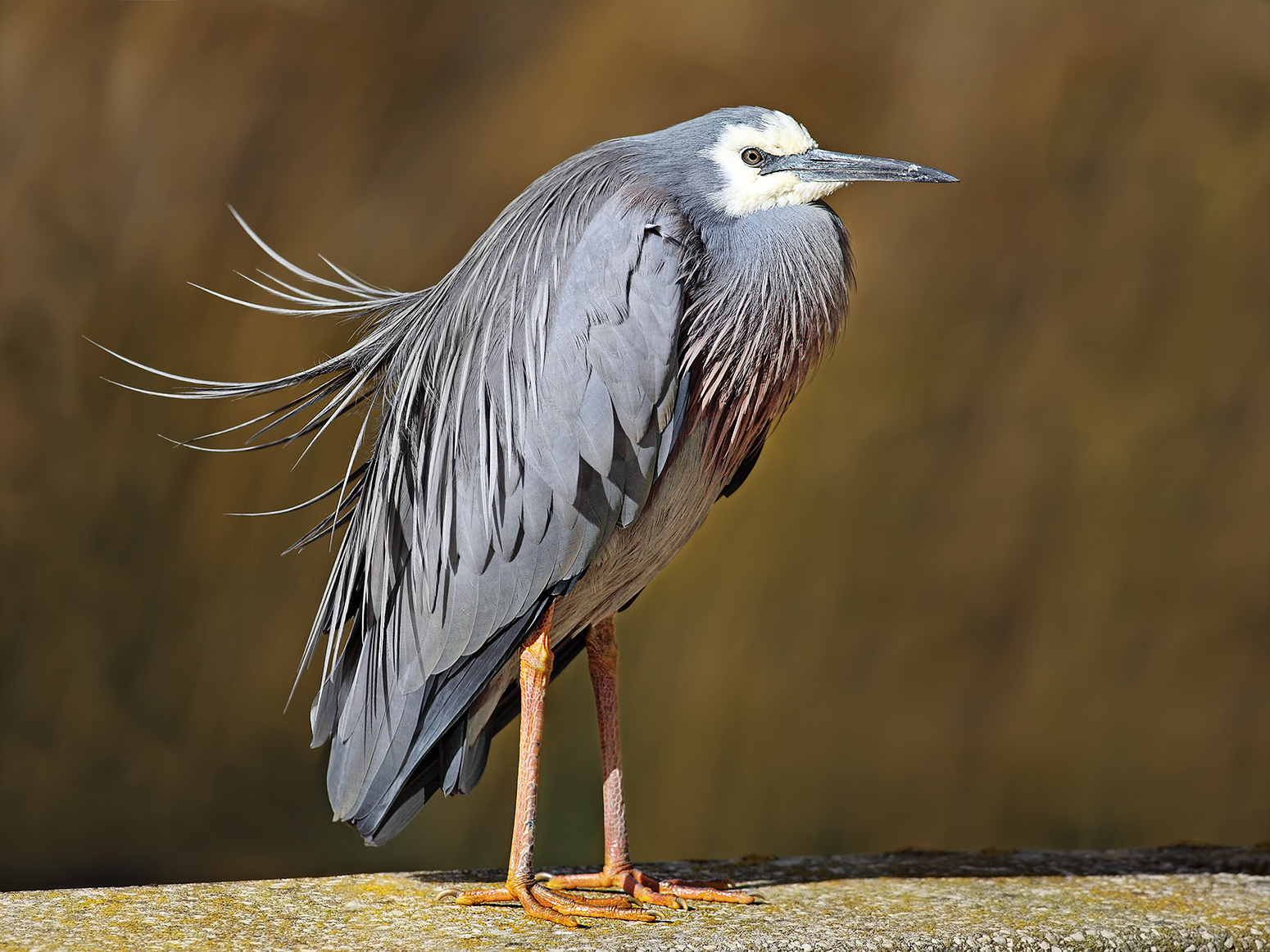
- White-faced heron, Egretta novaehollandiae

Scientific classification
- Kingdom: Animalia
- Phylum: Chordata
- Class: Aves
- Order: Pelecaniformes
- Family: Ardeidae
- Subfamily: Ardeinae
- Genus: Egretta; T. Forster, 1817

Type species
- Ardea garzetta Linnaeus, 1766

Species
- See text.

= Egretta =

Egretta Temporal range: Late Miocene to present

Genus of birds

Egretta is a genus of medium-sized herons, mostly breeding in warmer climates.

Representatives of this genus are found in most of the world, and the little egret, as well as being widespread throughout much of the Old World, has now started to colonise the Americas.

These are typical egrets in shape, long-necked and long-legged. A few plumage features are shared, although several have plumes in breeding plumage; a number of species are either white in all plumages, have a white morph (e.g. reddish egret), or have a white juvenile plumage (little blue heron).

The breeding habitat of Egretta herons is marshy wetlands in warm regions. They nest in colonies, often with other wading birds, usually on platforms of sticks in trees or shrubs.

These herons feed on insects, fish, and amphibians, caught normally by cautious stalking.

== Taxonomy ==
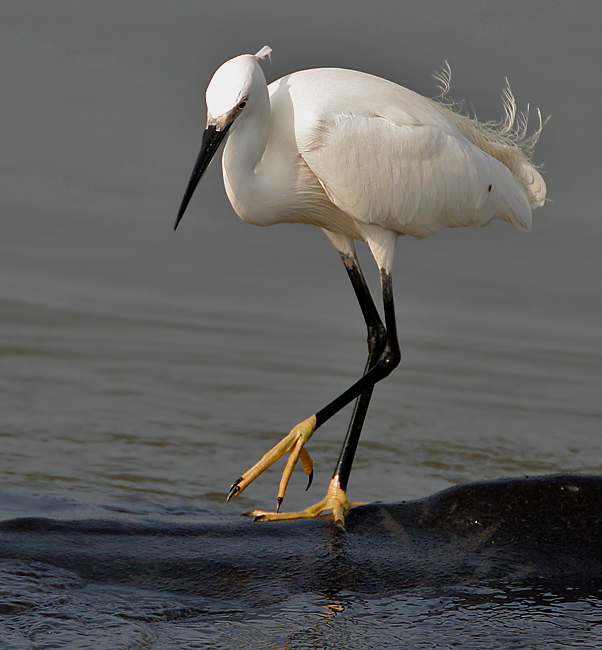
Little egret Egretta garzetta in Kolleru, Andhra Pradesh, India

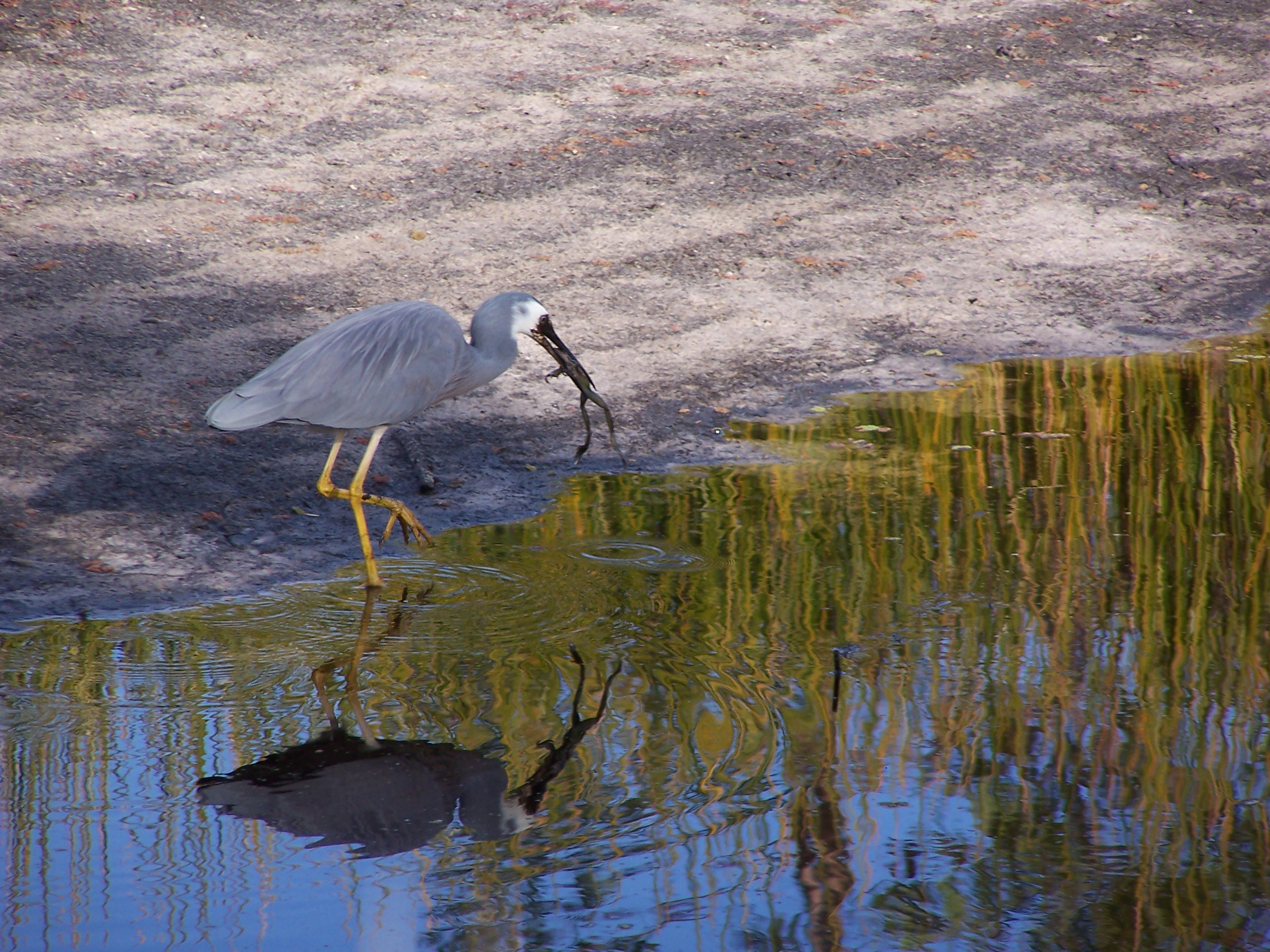
White-faced heron, E. novaehollandiae with a frog

The genus Egretta was introduced in 1817 by the German naturalist Johann Reinhold Forster with the little egret as the type species. The genus name comes from the Provençal French for the little egret, aigrette, a diminutive of aigron, "heron".

As with other heron groupings, the taxonomy of these birds has been a source of dispute. Some of these species have been placed with the great herons in Ardea, and conversely, the large white species such as the great egret are occasionally allocated to Egretta. The fact that some members of the genus have common names of "heron" and some of "egret", causes further confusion in differentiating between this genus and Ardea.

== Species ==
The genus contains 13 species:

Image	Scientific name	Common name	Distribution
	Egretta picata	Pied heron	Australia, Wallacea and New Guinea.
	Egretta novaehollandiae	White-faced heron	of Australasia, New Guinea, the islands of Torres Strait, Indonesia, New Zealand
	Egretta rufescens	Reddish egret	Central America, The Bahamas, the Caribbean, the Gulf Coast of the United States, and Mexico.
	Egretta ardesiaca	Black heron	Sub-Saharan Africa, from Senegal and Sudan to South Africa, Madagascar
	Egretta vinaceigula	Slaty egret	south-central Africa.
	Egretta tricolor	Tricolored heron, Louisiana heron	Gulf of Mexico and the Caribbean, to northern South America as far south as Brazil.
	Egretta caerulea	Little blue heron	United States, through Central America and the Caribbean south to Peru and Uruguay
	Egretta thula	Snowy egret	North, Central and South America.
	Egretta garzetta	Little egret	Europe, Africa, Asia, and Australia.
	Egretta gularis	Western reef heron	southern Europe, Africa and parts of Asia
	Egretta dimorpha	Dimorphic egret	Comoros, Kenya, Madagascar, Mayotte, Seychelles, and Tanzania.
	Egretta sacra	Pacific reef heron, Pacific reef egret, or eastern reef heron	southern Asia and Oceania.
	Egretta eulophotes	Chinese egret	east Asia.

A fossil species, Egretta subfluvia, is known from the Late Miocene or Early Pliocene of Florida.
