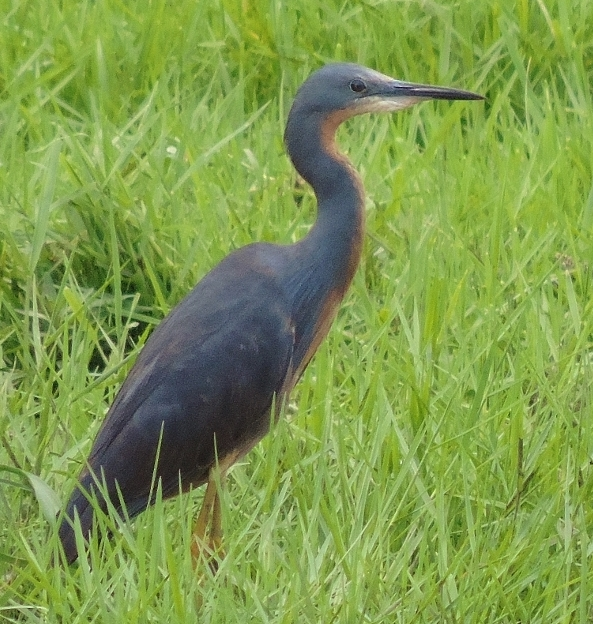

Conservation status
- Vulnerable (IUCN 3.1)

Scientific classification
- Kingdom: Animalia
- Phylum: Chordata
- Class: Aves
- Order: Pelecaniformes
- Family: Ardeidae
- Genus: Egretta
- Species: E. vinaceigula

Binomial name
- Egretta vinaceigula (Sharpe, 1895)
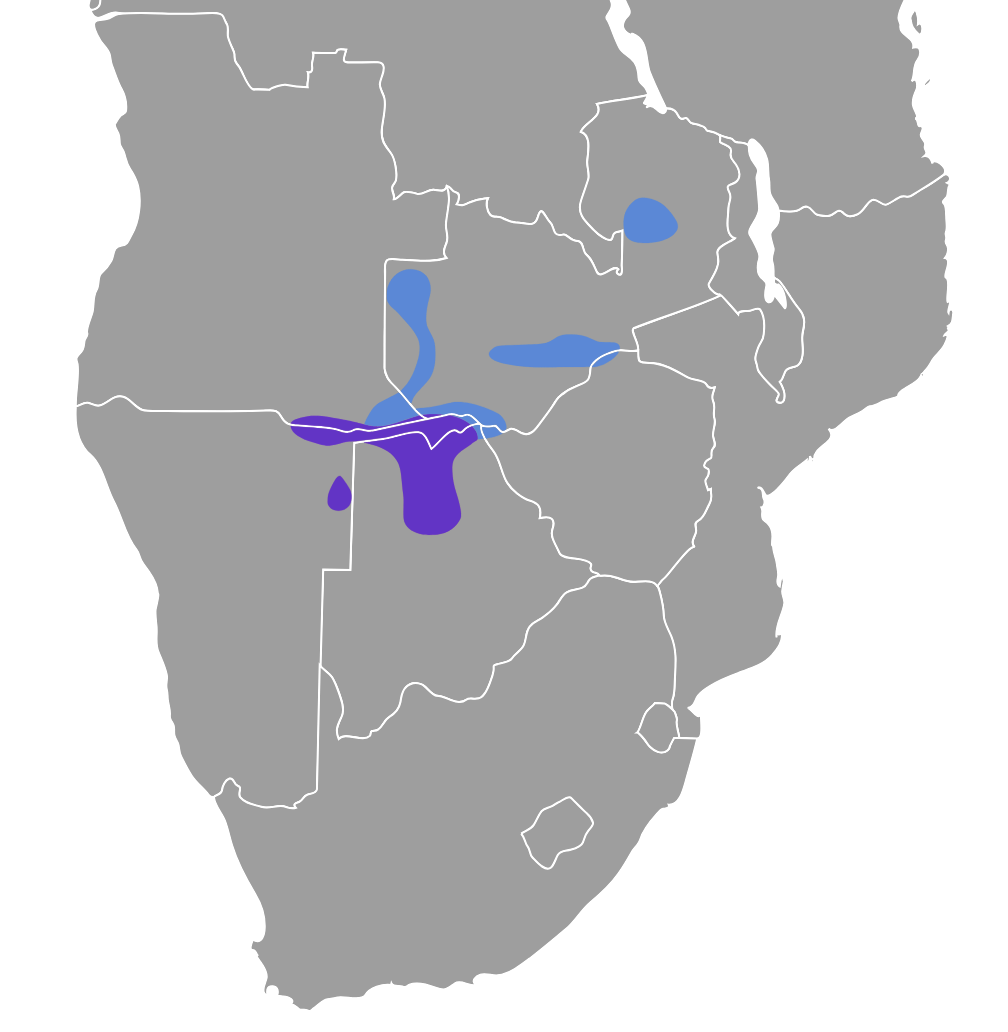
- year-round range non-breeding range

Synonyms
- Melanophoyx vinaceigula

= Slaty egret =

Species of bird

The slaty egret (Egretta vinaceigula) is a small, dark egret found in southern Africa. It is one of the species to which the Agreement on the Conservation of African-Eurasian Migratory Waterbirds (AEWA) applies. It is classified as Vulnerable, the biggest threat being habitat loss.

== Description ==
Until 1971, the slaty egret and more widespread black egret Egretta ardesiaca were thought to be colour morphs of the same species but the slaty egret shows consistent features which separate it from the black egret. These are the yellow legs and the vinous brown throat of the slaty egret, which extends down right onto the belly in immature birds. The slaty egret does not display the characteristic "mantling" behaviour of the black egret.

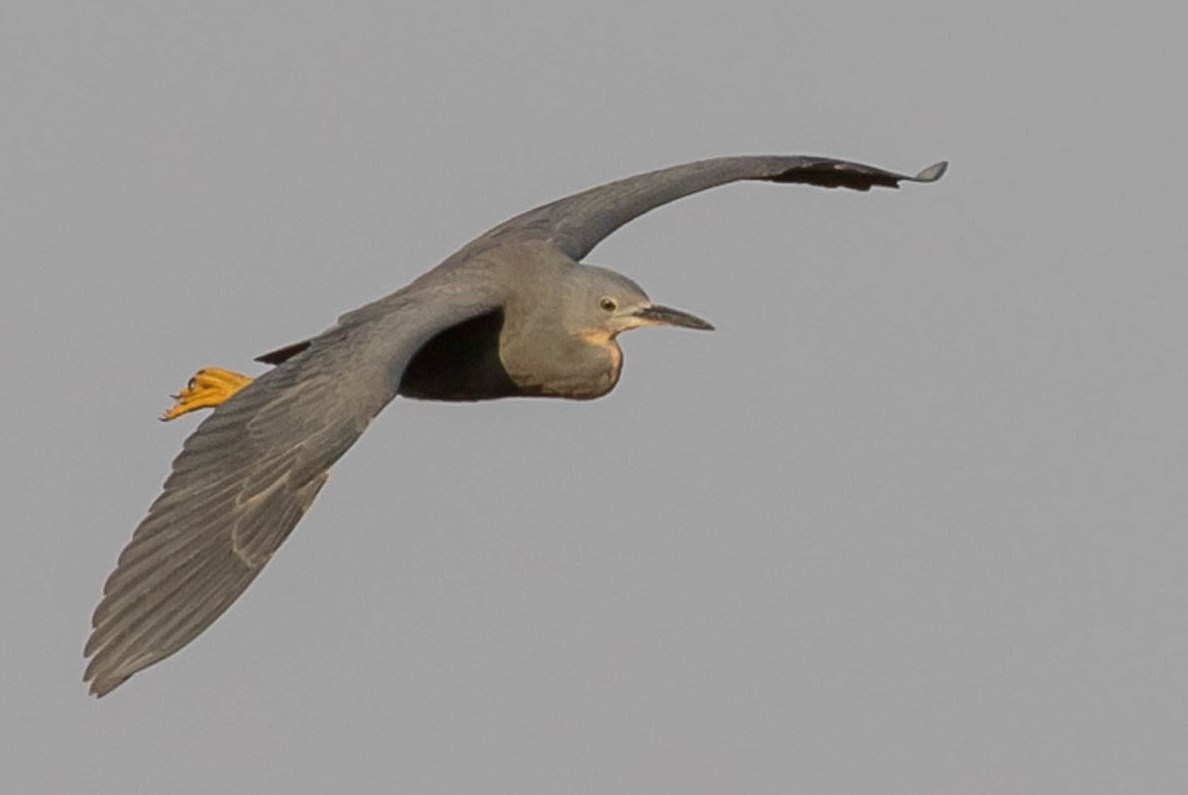
In flight in Namibia

== Distribution and population ==
The slaty egret lives in south-central Africa. The largest populations are found in Zambia and Botswana. In Zambia there are maybe 500 to 1,000 individuals, mainly found at Liuwa Plain National Park, Kafue Flats and Lake Bangweulu in some years but there are no confirmed breeding records. In northern Botswana there is a population of probably over 2,000 birds, mainly in the vicinity of the Okavango Delta and Chobe River. In this area there are at least 10 known colonies. This population extends into northern Namibia where an estimated 300 birds can be found the Chobe floodplain and Caprivi Strip. There is a single confirmed report of unsuccessful nesting in the Nylsvley Nature Reserve in the Limpopo Province of South Africa. It is more nomadic when not breeding, and has been recorded in Democratic Republic of Congo, Zimbabwe, and rarely in northern South Africa. In Mozambique its presence on the Zambezi Delta has not been confirmed and it may occur in Angola and possibly Malawi. Slaty egrets are almost always found in small numbers, e.g. rarely more than c. 100, the world population is probably in the order of 3,000 to 5,000 individuals.

== Habitat ==
The slaty egret is an inhabitant of floodplains, freshwater marshes, and temporary shallow wetlands, it shows a preference for areas where the water levels are falling back from their peak following seasonal rains. It is most often found in areas where there is good cover of low, emergent vegetation such as Cynodon dactylon and Panicum repens. Slaty egrets have been observed to be more numerous on floodplains which have been subjected to fire, and it is often found alongside the red lechwe antelope (Kobus leche). It prefers to forage in shallow water which is less than 10 cm deep.

== Breeding ==
Slaty egrets breed in temporary wetlands which the seasonal rains have filled to their highest level. The preferred breeding habitat is beds of Phragmites reeds, but it will also nest on islands of vegetation such as water figs (Ficus verruculosa), Acacia species or Senegal date palms (Phoenix reclinata). It may nest individually or in colonies of up to 60 nests. The nest is bowl shaped and lined with fine plant material constructed on a platform of sticks. Clutches are between one and four eggs which are incubated for 22–24 days.

== Behaviour ==
Slaty egrets are largely sedentary but they show some movement in response to rains, which cause seasonal variations in wetland conditions. These movements are poorly understood. It is a year-round resident in some areas, such as Zambia, yet it is not known to breed in that country. Infrequent records from countries abutting the main range i.e. Malawi, Zimbabwe, Mozambique and South Africa, demonstrate that slaty egrets are somewhat nomadic.

It prefers to feed mainly on small fish, especially cichlids, but in ephemeral wetlands where there are no fish, it will feed on frogs, aquatic invertebrates and tadpoles. It hunts by sight in clear, shallow water. It will also glean snails from lily pads and can catch dragonflies and other insects using a "standing flycatching" technique. It is a daytime forager, and often forages in association with other wading birds. Slaty egrets usually forage in small flocks of four to eight birds, although it may forage solitarily or even in larger aggregations of up to 60 birds.

== Conservation ==
As a species the slaty egret is highly dependent on seasonal marshes which are threatened by human factors such as drainage (for cultivation), flood regulation and dams as along the Kafue River, the erosion of river catchments, water abstraction for irrigation, invasive non-native vegetation, human disturbance including excessive trampling and over grazing by livestock and the harvesting of reeds and other marsh vegetation for human use. In Botswana a major threat to roosts and to colonies is the burning of the reed bed habitat. African elephants (Loxodonta africana) may be a threat to some nest sites through trampling and predation at some nest sites by African fish eagles (Haliaetus vocifer) may negatively affect productivity.
