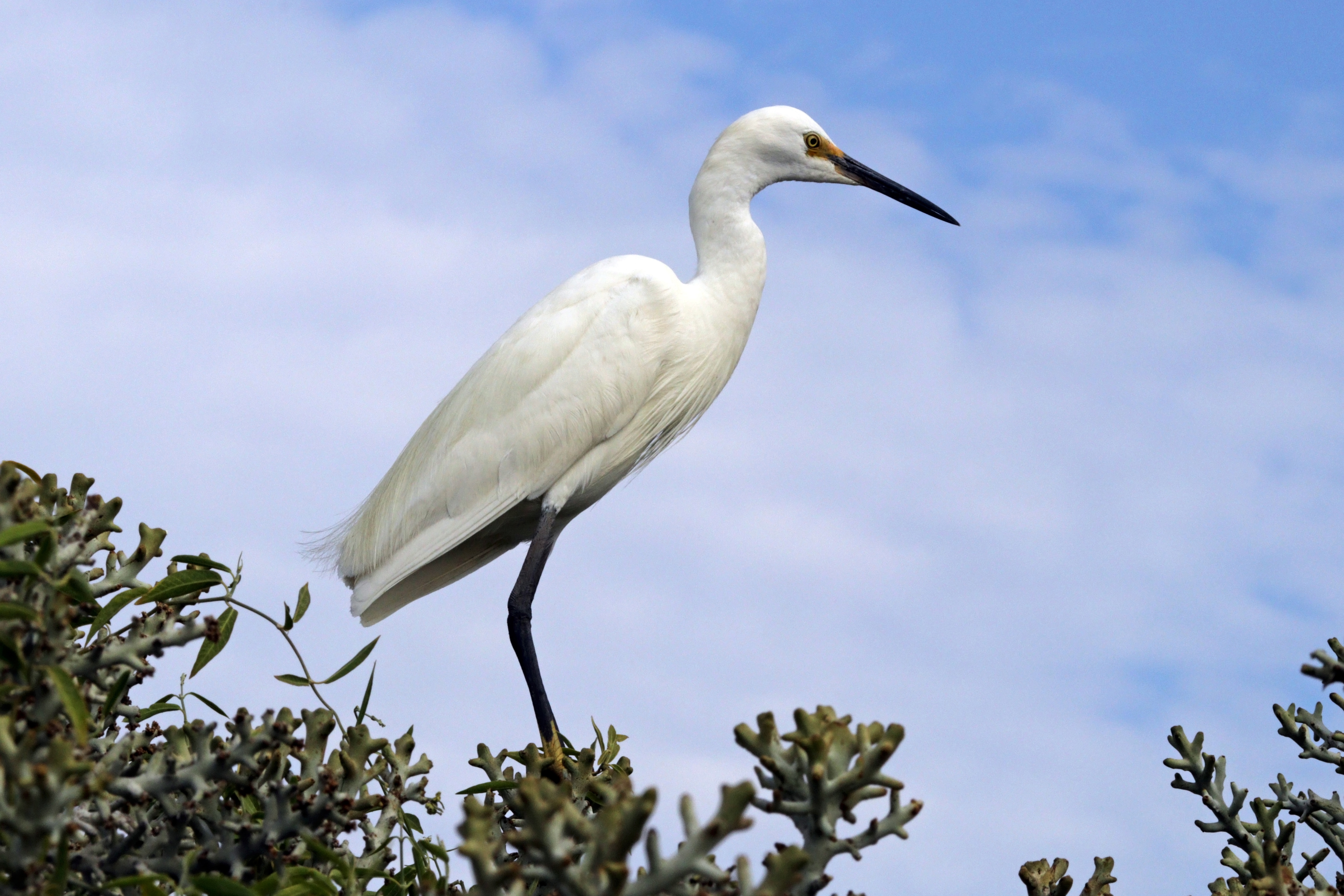
- White morph on Nosy Ve, Madagascar
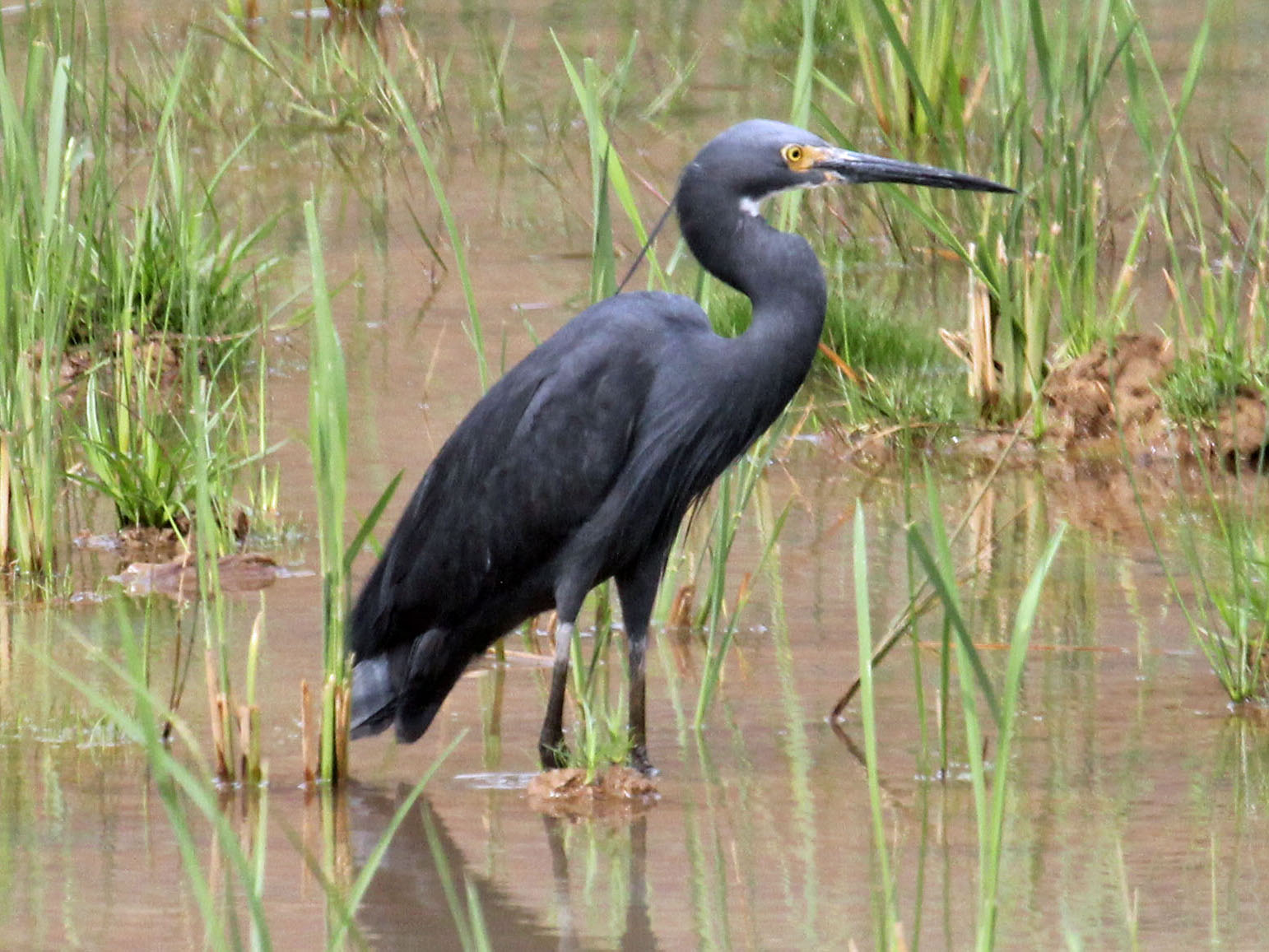
- Dark morph at Parc Tsarasaotra, Madagascar

Scientific classification
- Kingdom: Animalia
- Phylum: Chordata
- Class: Aves
- Order: Pelecaniformes
- Family: Ardeidae
- Genus: Egretta
- Species: E. dimorpha

Binomial name
- Egretta dimorpha Hartert, 1914

= Dimorphic egret =

Species of bird

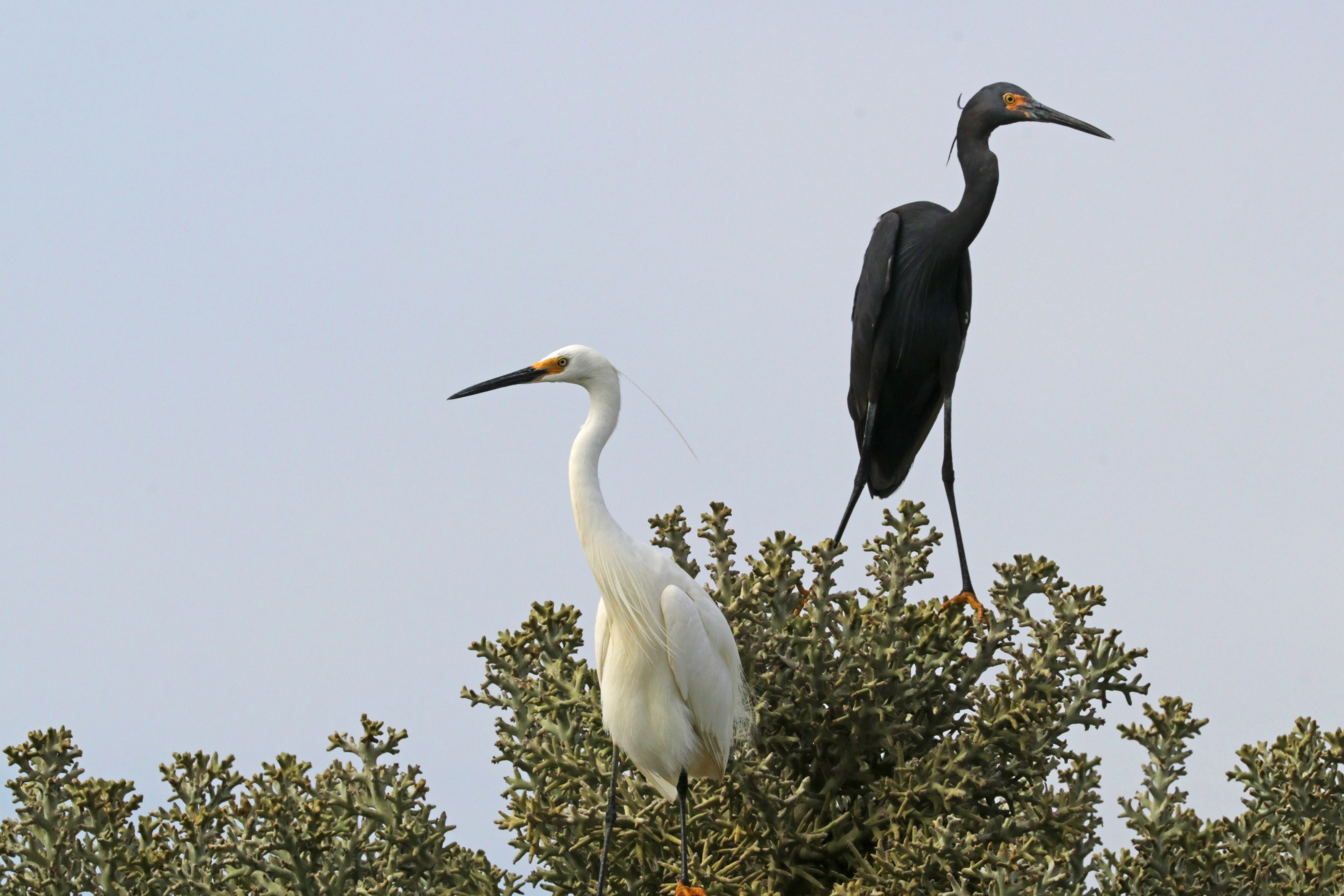
white and black morph together

The dimorphic egret (Egretta dimorpha) is a species of heron in the family Ardeidae. It is found in Comoros, Kenya, Madagascar, Mayotte, Seychelles, and Tanzania.

The dimorphic egret is sometimes considered as a subspecies of the western reef egret (Egretta gularis) or as a subspecies of the little egret (Egretta garzetta).

The dimorphic egret can sometimes be found on rooftops, finding insects in the gutters of houses.
