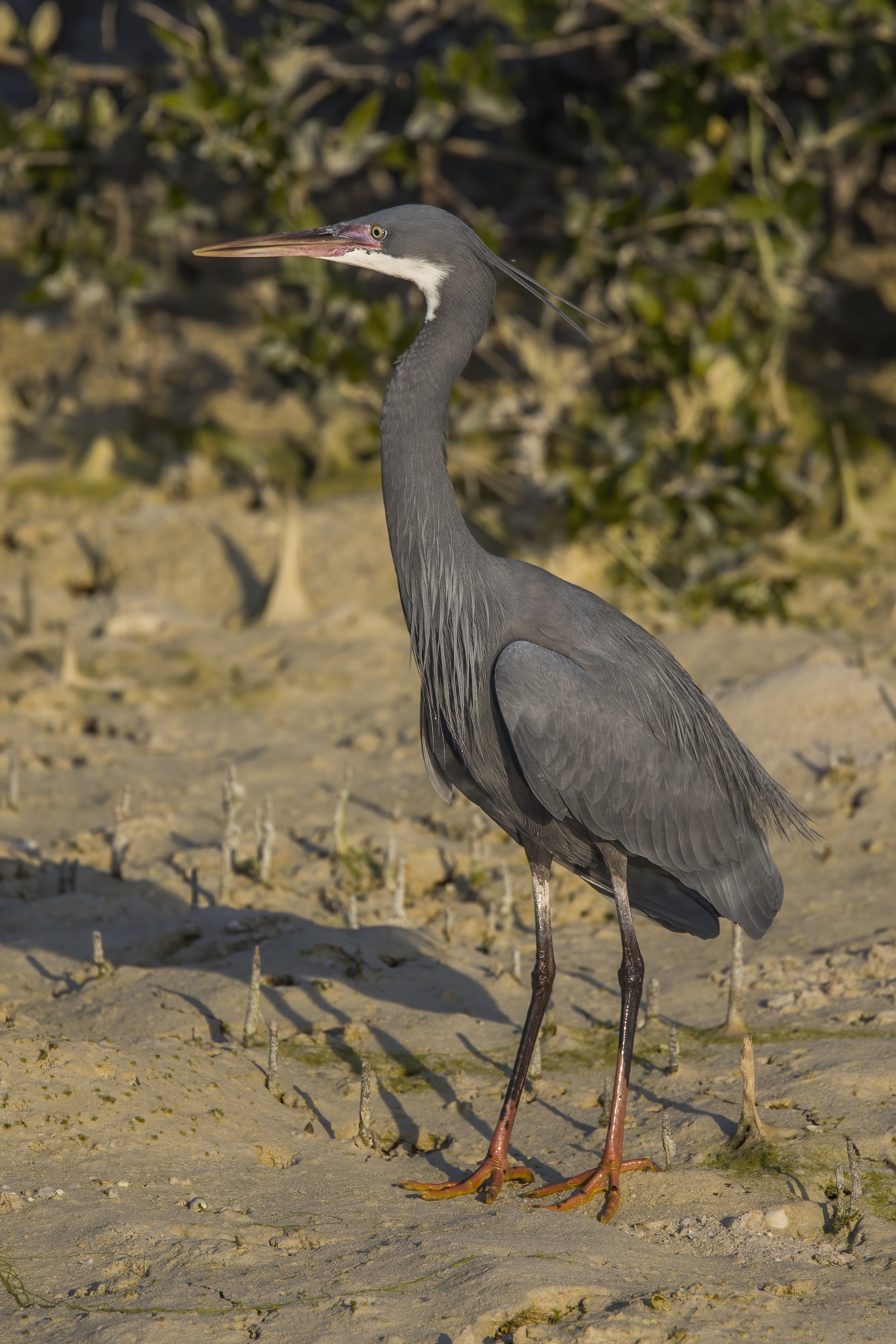
- E. g. schistacea dark morph Dohat Arad Lagoon, Muharraq, Bahrain

Conservation status
- Least Concern (IUCN 3.1)

Scientific classification
- Kingdom: Animalia
- Phylum: Chordata
- Class: Aves
- Order: Pelecaniformes
- Family: Ardeidae
- Genus: Egretta
- Species: E. gularis

Binomial name
- Egretta gularis (Bosc, 1792)
- Range with subspecies and related species. For dimorpha, see dimorphic egret

= Western reef heron =

Species of bird

The western reef heron (Egretta gularis), also called the western reef egret, is a medium-sized heron found in Africa and parts of Asia, with vagrancy occurring in Europe and the Americas. It has a mainly coastal distribution and occurs in several plumage forms: a slaty-grey plumage which can only be confused with the rather uncommon dark morph of the little egret (Egretta garzetta); a white form which can look very similar to the little egret, although the reef heron's bill tends to be paler and larger; and a black form with a white throat, E. g. gularis, found in West Africa. There are also differences in size, structure and foraging behaviour. There have been suggestions that the species hybridizes with the little egret, and based on this, some authors treat schistacea and gularis as subspecies of Egretta garzetta. Works that consider the western reef heron as a valid species include the nominate gularis and schistacea as subspecies.

== Description ==
This bird has two plumage colour forms. There is an all-white morph and a dark grey morph; morphs can also occur with intermediate shades of grey which may be related to age or particoloured in grey and white. The white morph is similar in general appearance to the little egret, but has a larger yellower bill, extended yellow on thicker legs, and when foraging tends to be very active, sometimes also moving its wing or using it to shade the water surface. The grey morph has a whitish throat and is unlikely to be confused with any other species within the range of this egret with beak and legs similar to that of the white morph. During the breeding season the legs and facial skin are reddish. Breeding birds have two long feathers on the sides of the nape. The nominate subspecies gularis has a range from West Africa to Gabon, with some birds breeding in southern Europe. Subspecies schistacea (Hemprich & Ehrenberg, 1828) breeds from the Persian Gulf along the coast of India to the east of the India Peninsula. The bill of gularis is more pointed while schistacea has the larger bill especially towards the base. The form on the eastern coast of South Africa is usually separated as the dimorphic egret Egretta dimorpha. The dark and white morph is thought to be controlled by a single allele with the dark character being incompletely dominant over the gene for white.

== Taxonomy and systematics ==
The species was first described as Ardea gularis from a specimen obtained in Senegal by the French naturalist Louis Augustin Guillaume Bosc in 1792. The distinctive white throat (or gular region) in the dark morph gives it the species name. Later authors have treated it the genera Demiegretta (in which dimorphic egrets were once included), Herodias and Lepterodius until its current stable position in the genus Egretta. The distinctness of this species from Egretta garzetta has however been highly debated with some authors treating garzetta as a polytypic superspecies. There has been confusion related to what were thought to be dark little egrets and the possibility of hybrids. Dark morphs in little egrets are extremely rare and nearly all specimens of what were thought to be dark morphs have turned out to be western reef herons. In India some research claimed circumstantial evidence of interbreeding with little egrets, but the same researchers noted that the breeding seasons of the two species were different. Hybridization has also been claimed to occur in Morocco and Kenya (but this might refer to Egretta dimorpha). Christidis and Boles quote a report by McCracken and Sheldon (2002) that the nucleotide sequences of the cytochrome b genes from a sampled little egret and a western reef heron were identical and use this as evidence for demotion. The sequences and the origins of the samples are not publicly available or verifiable. In the past the Indian form which was also described as Ardea asha by William Henry Sykes has been treated as a subspecies of the little egret as Egretta garzetta schistacea on the basis of presumed hybridization with Egretta gularis. The lores of breeding little egrets are blue while those of the reef heron are reddish although some individuals of schistacea show blue and this is thought to be due to hybridization. The dark coastal form of Madagascar, Aldabra, Comoro Islands, Seychelles and parts of East Africa (southern Kenya to Tanzania) was earlier treated as a subspecies (the mainland African form has sometimes been considered as schistacea) but is now raised to full species as the dimorphic egret (Egretta dimorpha).

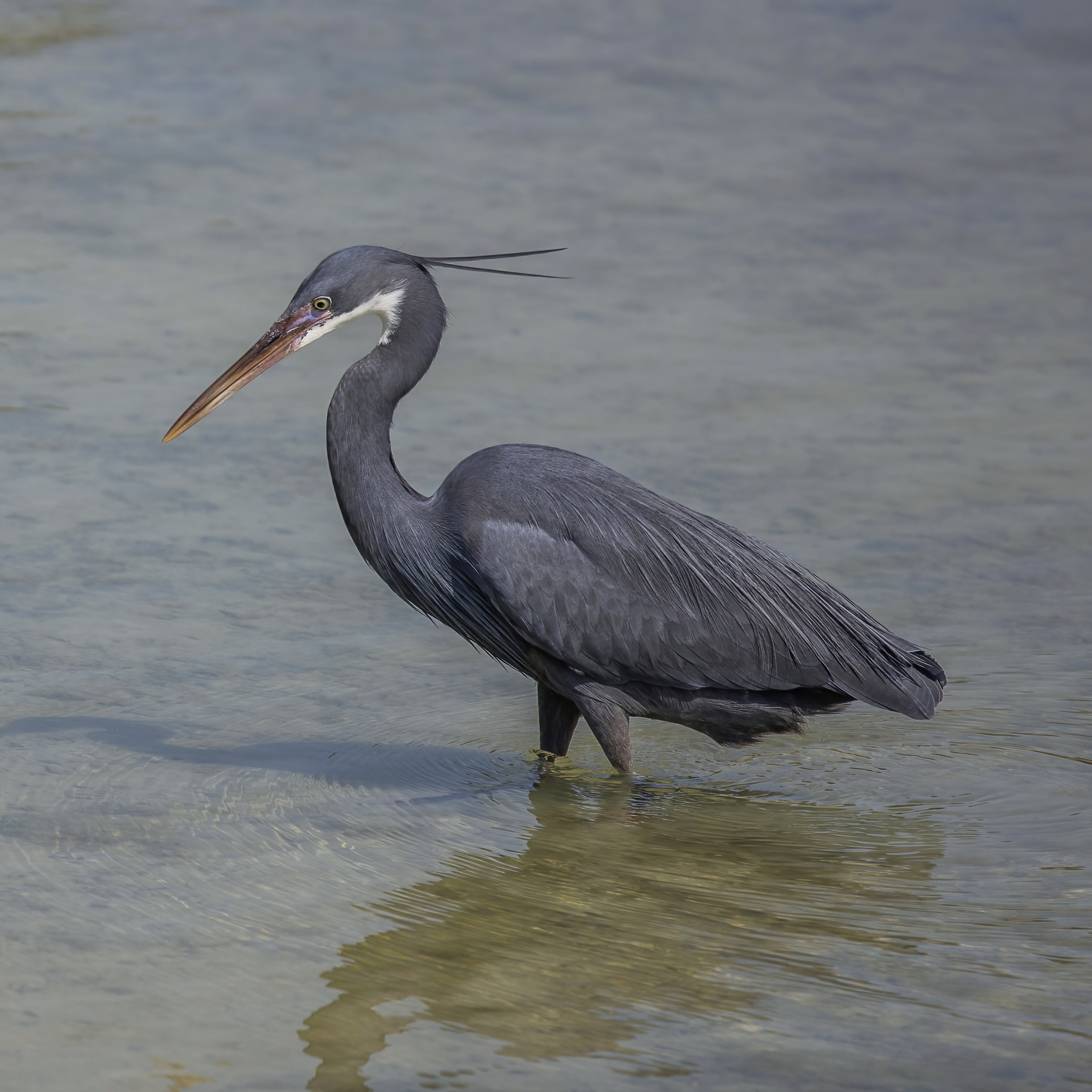
Dark morph, Bahrain

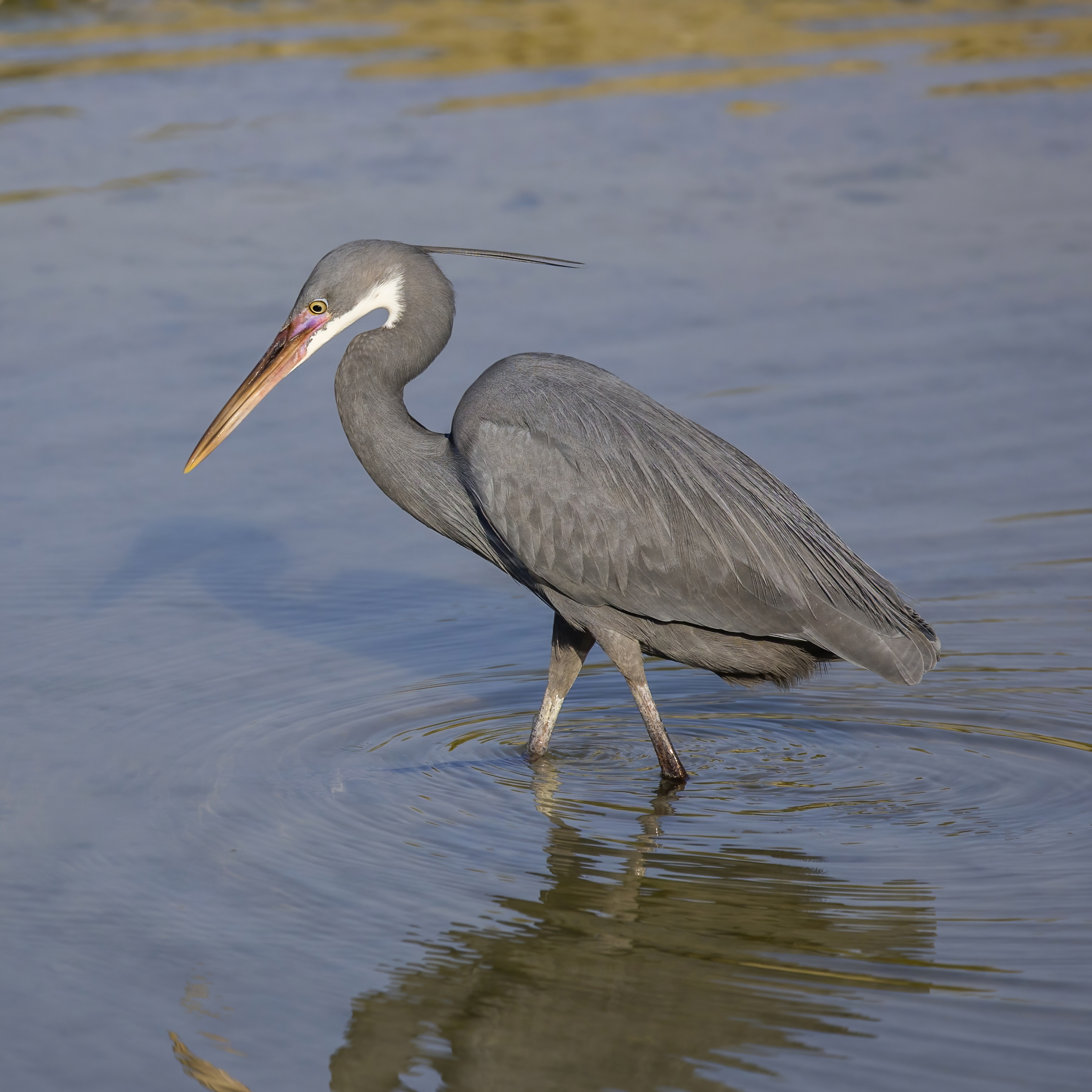
Slate grey morph, Bahrain

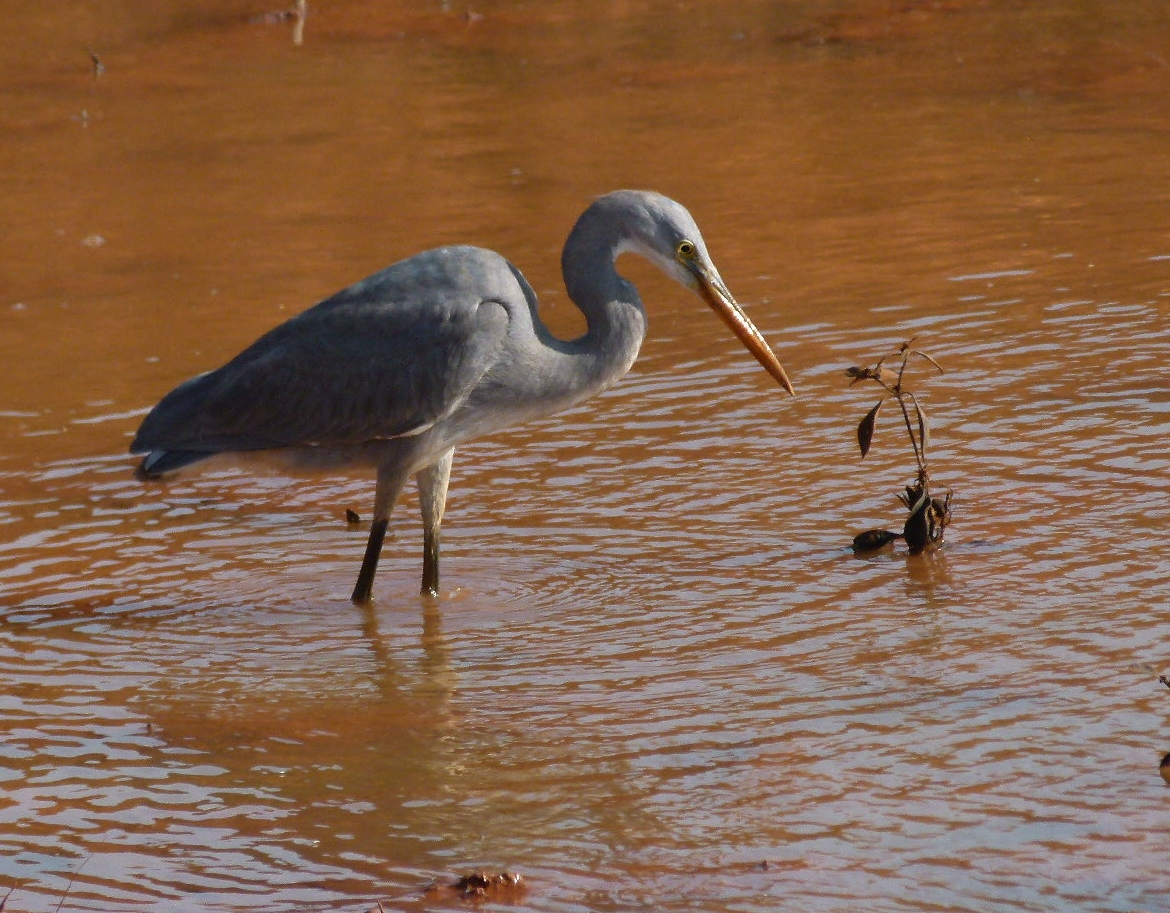
A light grey form that has been considered as a hybrid

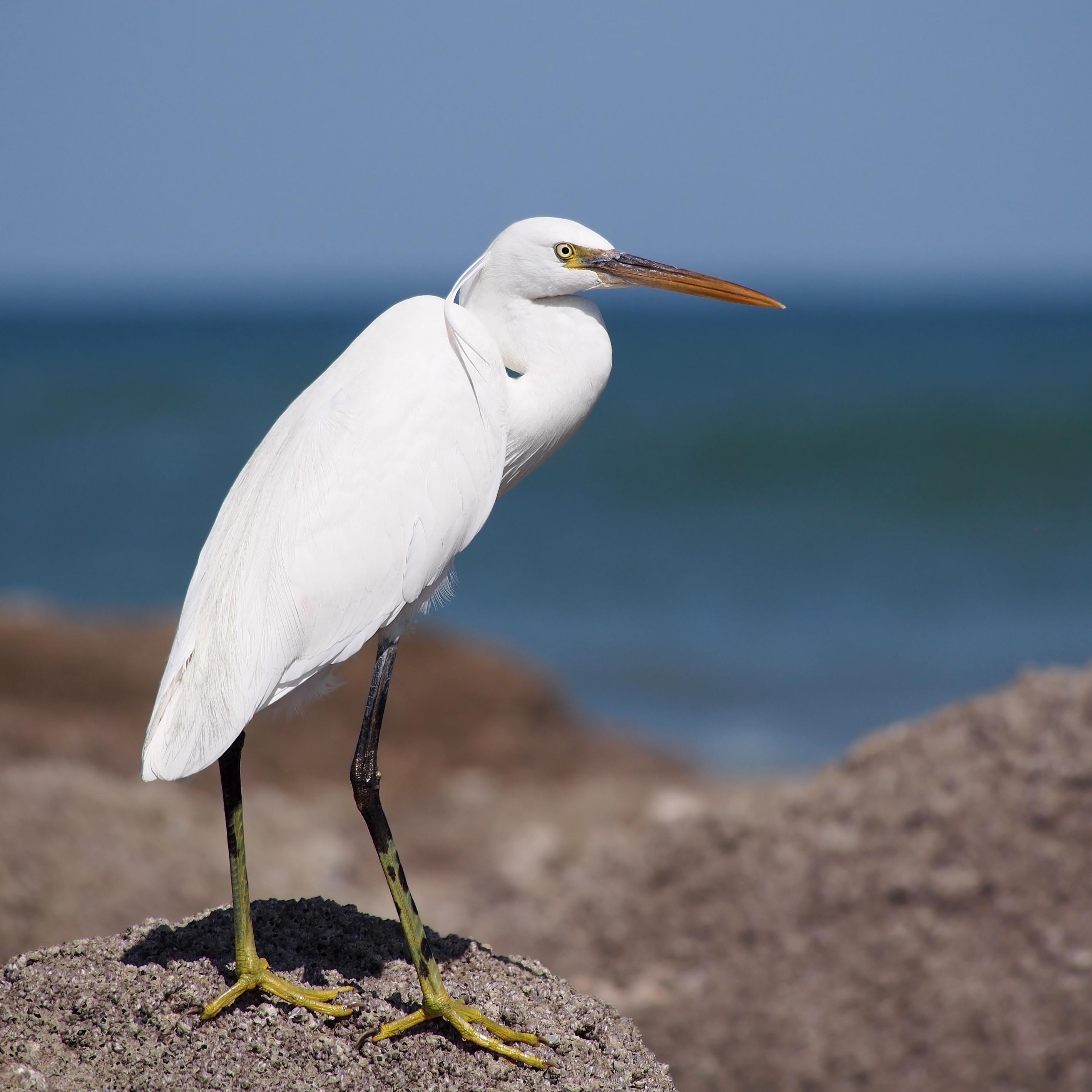
White morph, Muscat

== Distribution and status ==
It occurs mainly on the coasts in tropical west Africa, the Red Sea, the Persian Gulf (Iran) extending east to India. It also occurs in the Lakshadweep Islands and Sri Lanka where breeding was once recorded at Chilaw. The nominate subspecies breeds in west Africa from Mauritania to Gabon. Birds may also be found off the mainland such as in the Canary Islands. Small numbers have been recorded hybridising with liitle egrets in Spain. Subspecies schistacea is found from the Red Sea coast east round the Indian coast. Breeding colonies are known from the east coast of India around Pulicat Lake. They occasionally occur further inland.

The western reef heron (nominate subspecies) occurs as a vagrant in North America, South America and the Caribbean islands. Based on the growing number of records it is suspected that they may establish breeding colonies in Brazil. Several records around 1980–1990 in Germany, Austria and France have been attributed to birds that escaped from an animal dealer in Mittelfranken.

In June 2026 a member of the species was identified by sight in Caernarfon in Wales.

== Behaviour and ecology ==
These birds stalk their prey in shallow water, often running or stirring the water with their feet or flicking their wings to disturb prey; they may also stand still and wait to ambush prey. They eat fish, crustaceans, and molluscs. In coastal areas, they regularly feed on mudskippers. Laboratory studies show them to be capable of making corrections for refractions but the probability of missing increases when they are forced to strike at prey at very acute angles to the water surface. Like other herons and egrets they have few vocalizations, making a low kwok or grating sounds when disturbed or near the nest.

The western reef heron's breeding habitat is coastal wetlands. In the Red Sea region the breeding season is from June to August. The nominate subspecies breeds in West Africa from late April to September. In India the breeding season is during the monsoon rains from April to August and end of May in the former breeding colony at Chilaw in Sri Lanka. Most of the breeding colonies in Gujarat in western India were on mangroves. They nest in colonies usually of their own species but sometimes with other egrets and smaller herons, usually on platforms of sticks placed in trees or shrubs. The male fetches sticks of the nest while the female places them to form the platform. The nest height varies from about 5 to 15 meters (16 to 49 ft), but very low nesting (as low as 0.6 meters) has been observed in mangrove trees in salt pans. The usual clutch is three to four eggs which are light blue as in the little egret. Incubation begins when the first egg is laid resulting in chicks with size disparities. Both parents take turns to incubate and the eggs hatch after about 23 to 24 days. The chicks are white with grey dapples. Young birds sometimes die after falling off from the nest platform. Adults will shade the chicks during the hotter parts of the day. Predators of eggs include rats and young chicks may be taken by cats and crows. Adults usually guard the nest when eggs or young chicks are present. Adults feed the young by regurgitating semi-digested food at the nest. This diet includes mainly small fishes of the families Clupeidae, Gobiidae and Engraulidae. The young birds leave the nest after about a month.

== Gallery ==
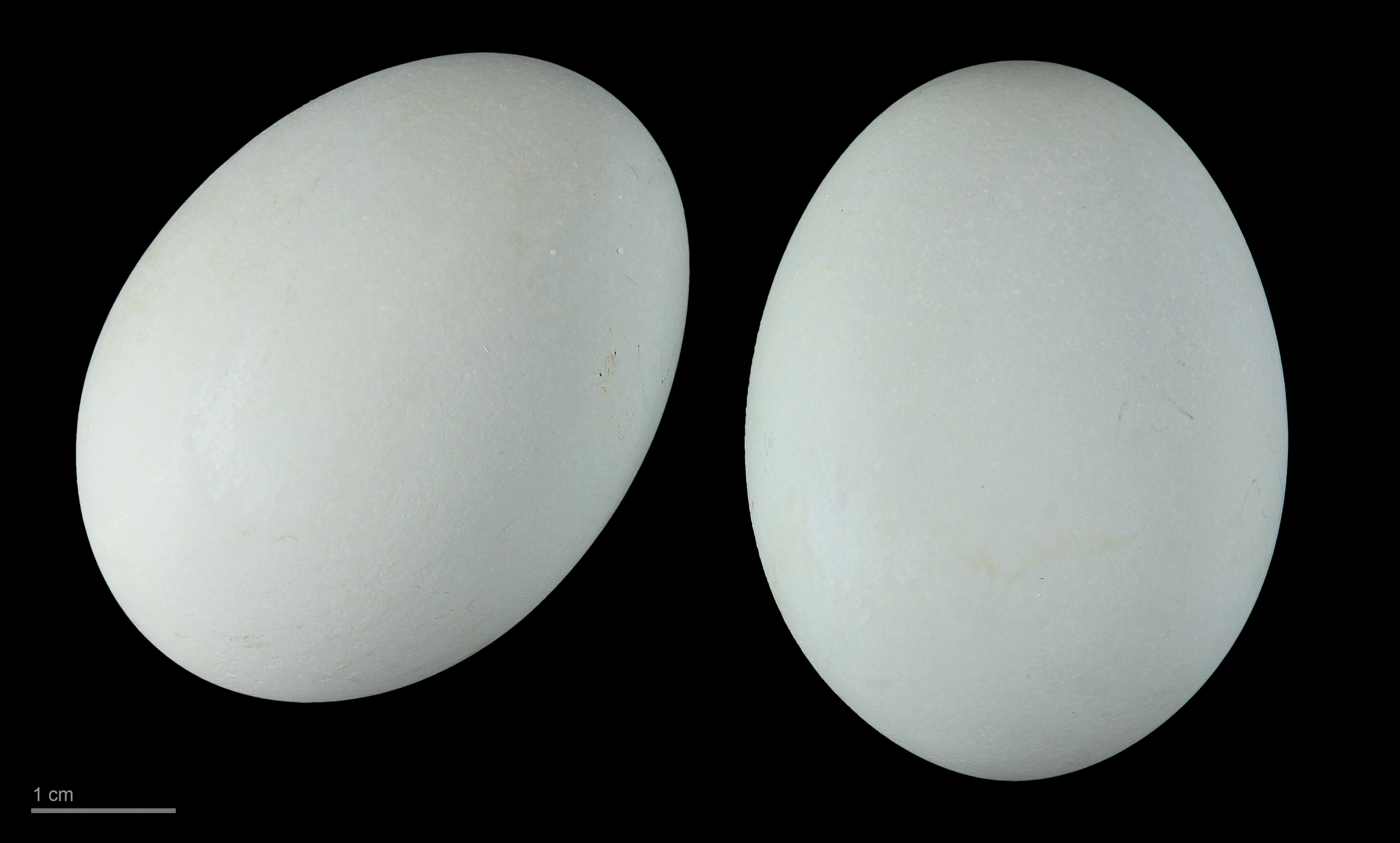
Egretta gularis - MHNT

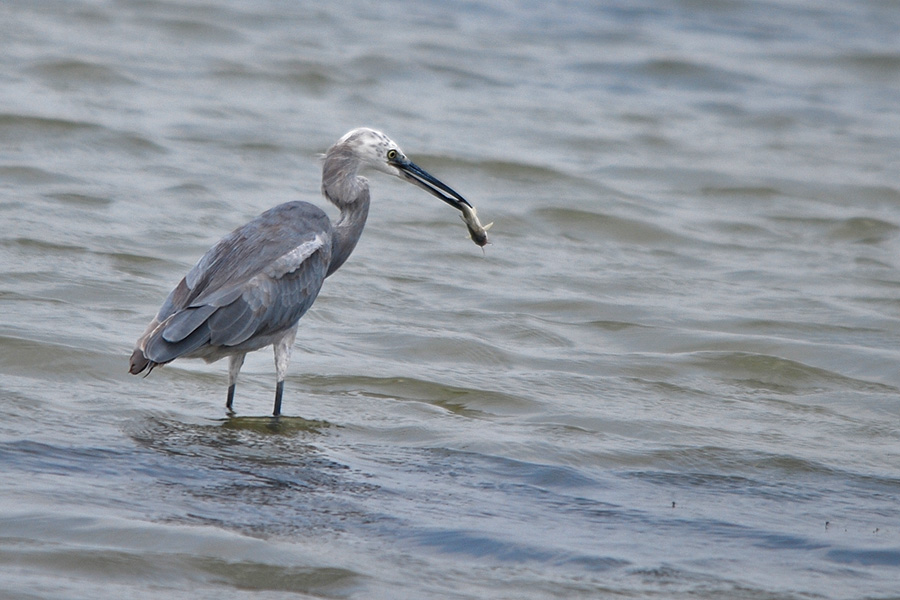
E. g. schistacea with a black beak (Pulicat Lake)

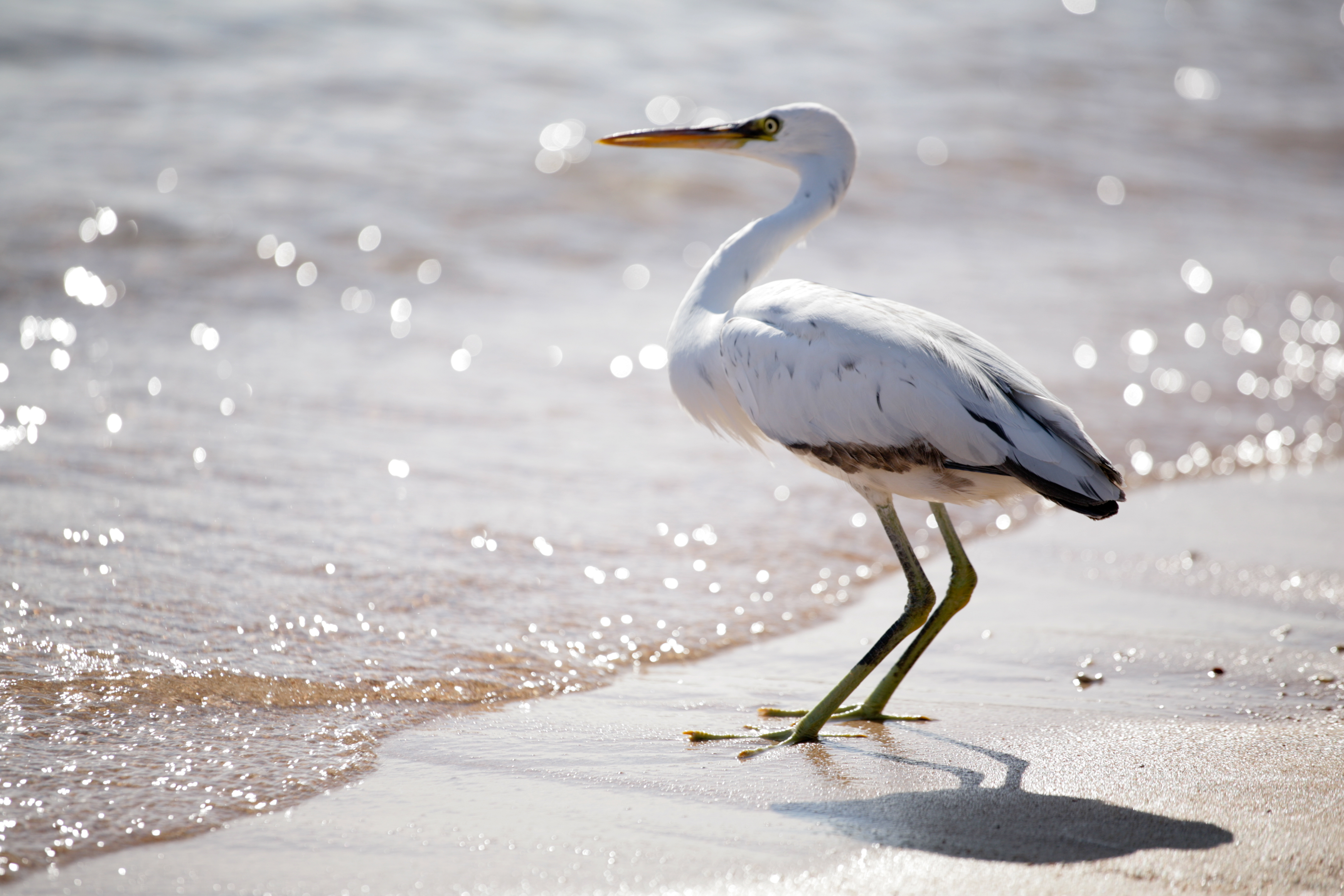
Particoloured form (Egypt)

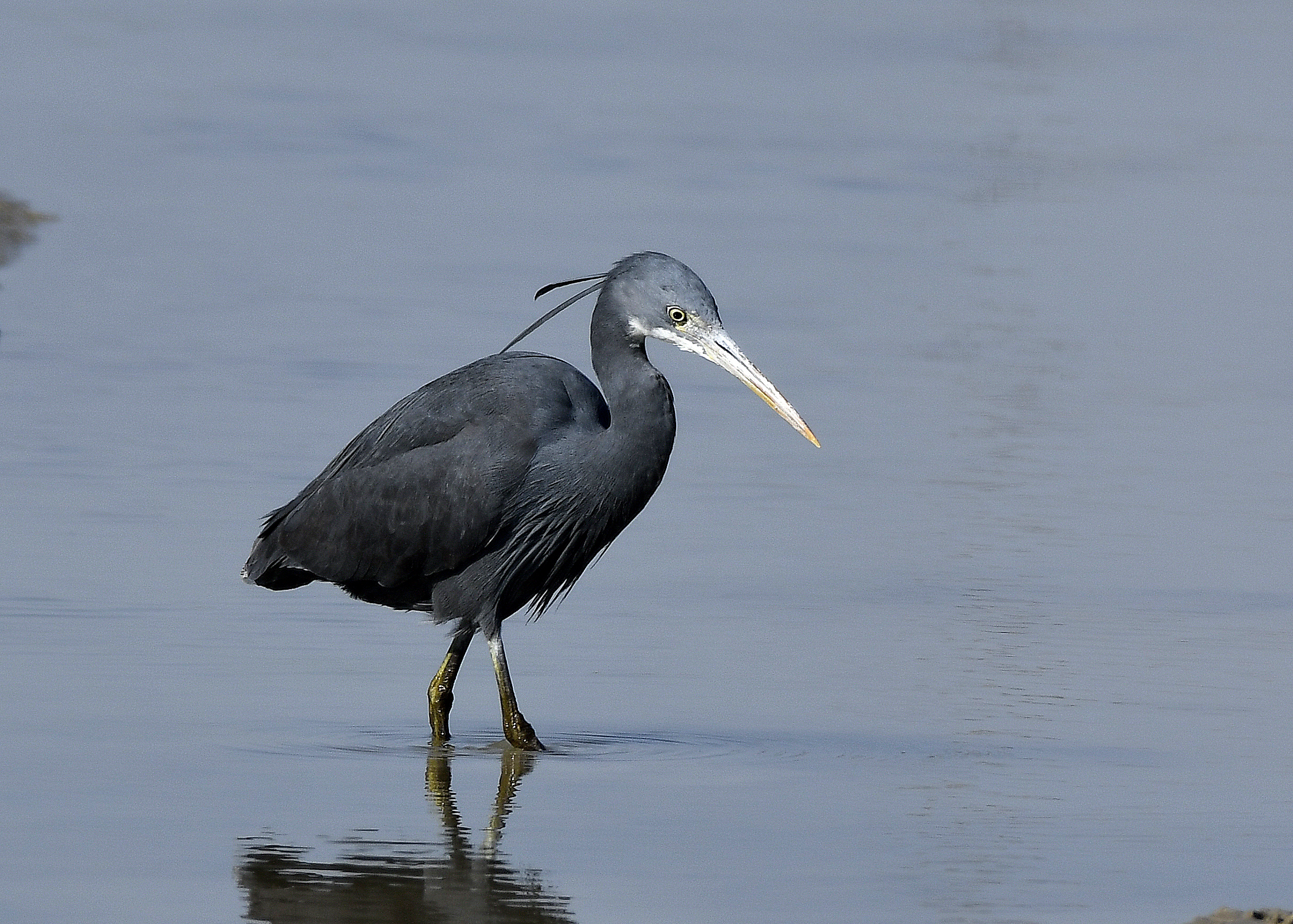
E. g. schistacea dark morph at Narara Marine National Park, Gulf of Kutch, Gujarat, India

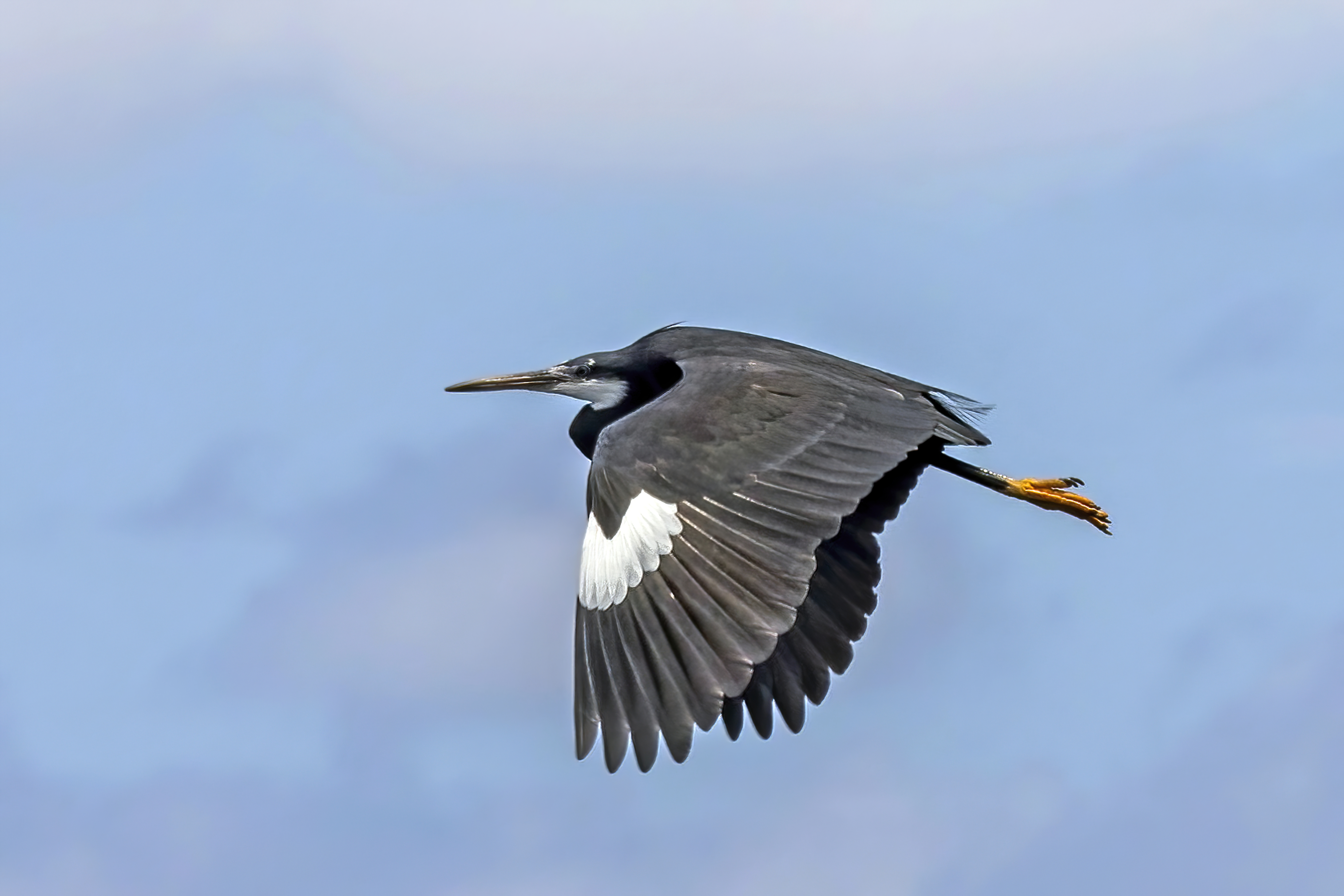
E. g. gularis dark morph in flight, showing white carpal area, São Tomé and Príncipe
