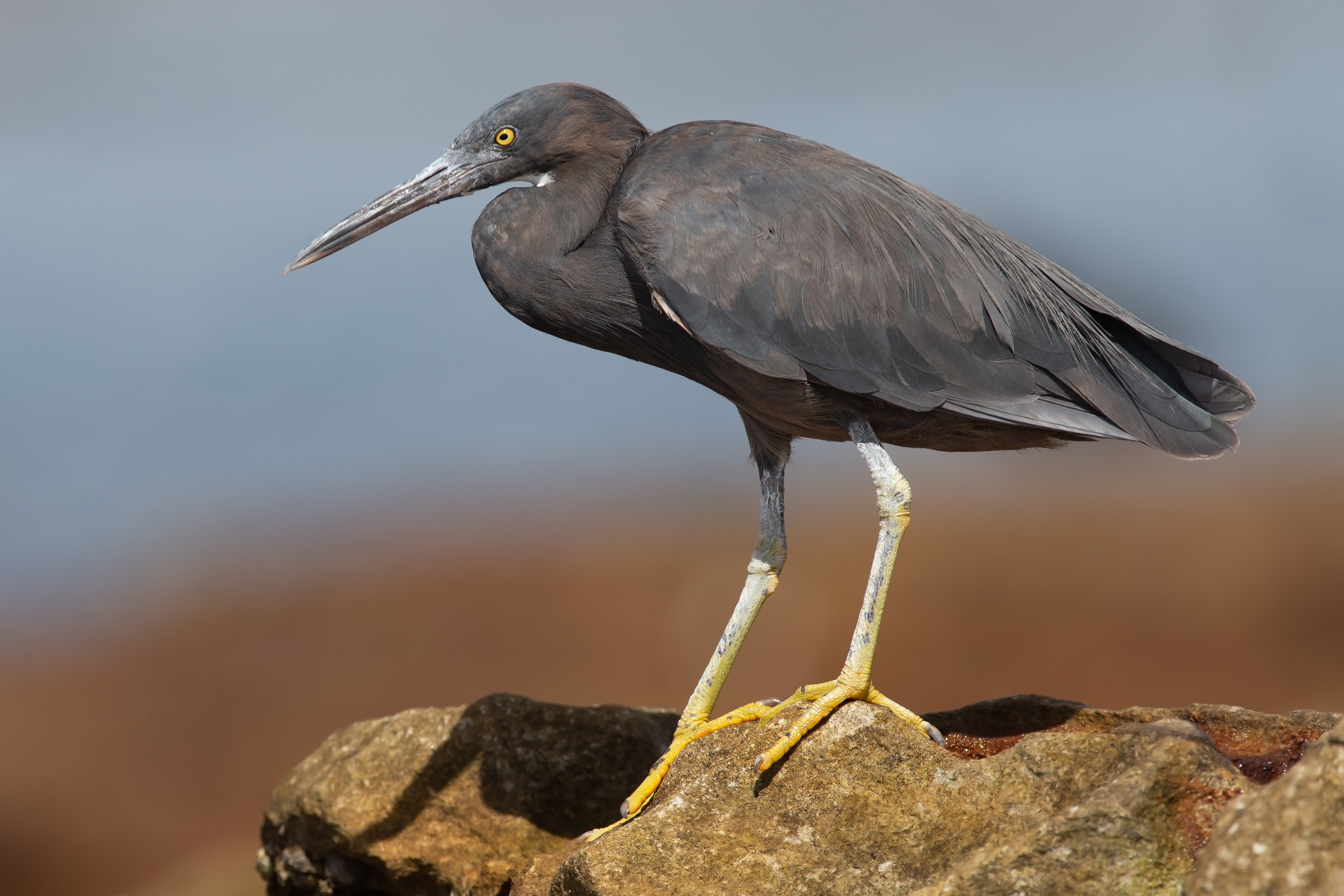
- Dark morph
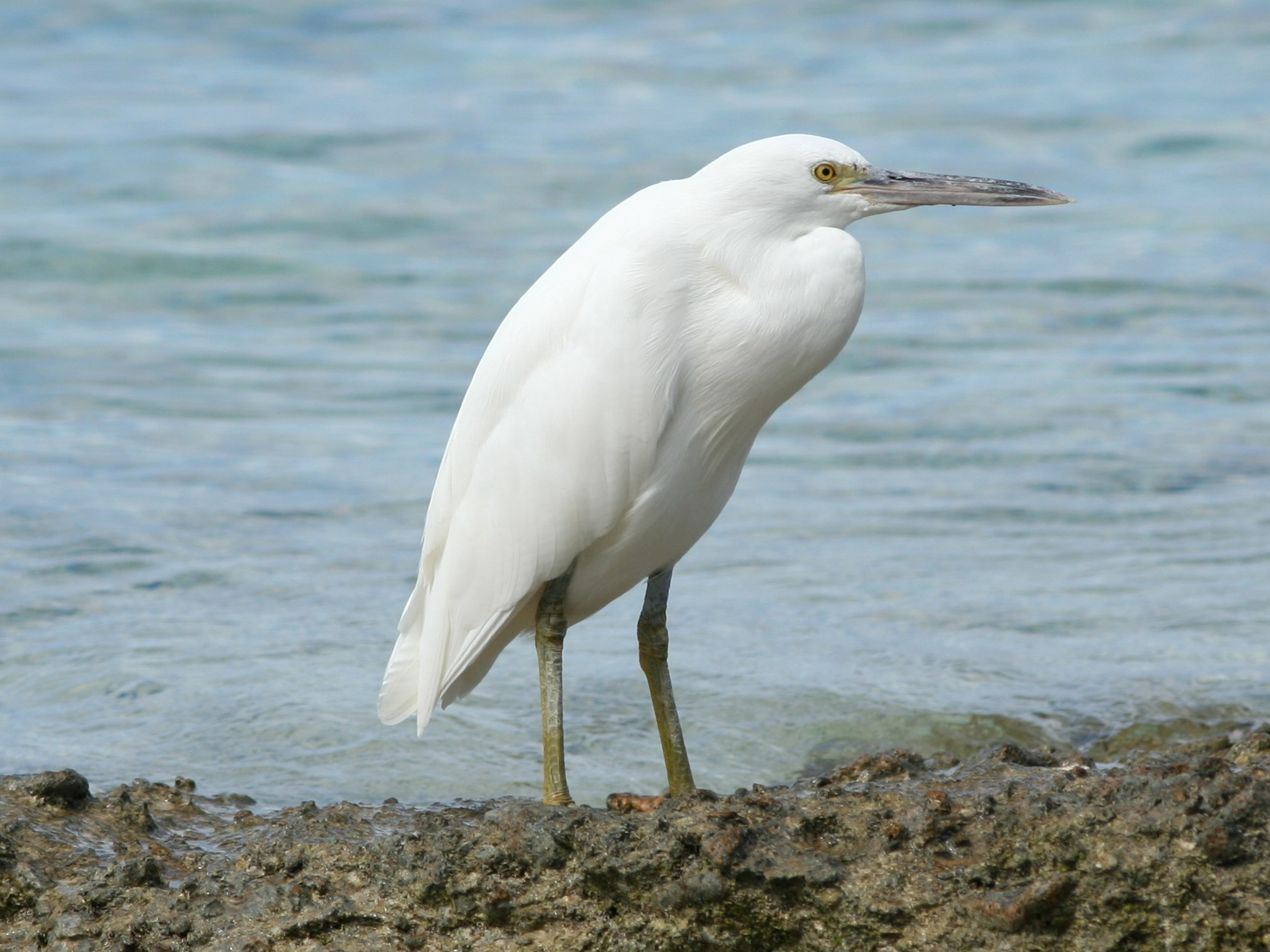
- Light morph

Conservation status
- Least Concern (IUCN 3.1)

Scientific classification
- Kingdom: Animalia
- Phylum: Chordata
- Class: Aves
- Order: Pelecaniformes
- Family: Ardeidae
- Genus: Egretta
- Species: E. sacra

Binomial name
- Egretta sacra (Gmelin, 1789)

= Pacific reef heron =

Species of bird

The Pacific reef heron (Egretta sacra), also known as the eastern reef heron or eastern reef egret, is a species of heron found throughout southern Asia and Oceania. It occurs in two colour morphs with either slaty grey or pure white plumage. The sexes are similar in appearance.

== Taxonomy ==
The Pacific reef heron was formally described in 1789 by the German naturalist Johann Friedrich Gmelin in his revised and expanded edition of Carl Linnaeus's Systema Naturae. He placed it with the herons, cranes and egrets in the genus Ardea and coined the binomial name Ardea sacra. Gmelin based his description on the "Sacred heron" that had been described in 1785 by the English ornithologist John Latham in his multi-volume work A General Synopsis of Birds. The naturalist Joseph Banks had provided Latham with a specimen of a white morph that had been collected on Tahiti. The Pacific reef heron is now placed with 12 other species in the genus Egretta that was introduced in 1817 by the German naturalist Johann Reinhold Forster. The genus name comes from the Provençal French for the little egret, aigrette, a diminutive of aigron, "heron". The specific epithet sacra is from Latin sacer meaning "sacred". The Pacific reef heron is referred to by a variety of names by the indigenous peoples of the Pacific region. In New Zealand, multiple names have been given, including kākatai, matuku moana and matuku tai. It is known as belō in Fiji, matu'u in the Samoan Islands, and motuku in Niue, Tonga, and Wallis Island.

Two subspecies are recognised:

- E. s. sacra (Gmelin, JF, 1789) – coastal south Bangladesh and Andaman Islands to Ryukyu Islands (south Japan), Australasia (except south outlying islands), Melanesia (except New Caledonia) to Tuamotu Archipelago (east Polynesia)
- E. s. albolineata (Gray, GR, 1859) – New Caledonia including Loyalty Islands

== Description ==
Pacific reef herons are medium-sized herons, reaching 57 to 66 cm (22 to 26 in) in length. They have a wingspan of between 90 and 110 cm (35 and 43 in) and reach an average weight of 400 g (14 oz). The species displays an unusual, non-sexual dimorphism, with some members having entirely white plumage ('light' morph) and others (the larger portion) being charcoal-grey ('dark' morph). The reason for the colour variation or "morph", is unknown, though it is most commonly thought to be related to camouflage. The plumage of immature herons tends to be browner and duller in colour.

Pacific reef herons have yellow-grey legs, and the grey variety's throats and chins are marked by a narrow, white stripe. They have brown beaks, gold-yellow coloured eyes and the surrounding areas of their faces are normally of a greenish to yellow cast.

== Distribution and habitat ==
The Pacific reef heron is widely distributed across southern Asia and Oceania. In Australia, Pacific reef herons inhabits most of the coastline, and offshore islands including the Torres Strait Islands.

Pacific reef herons are widespread across Micronesia, with breeding records in Guam, the Marshall Islands, Northern Mariana Islands, and Palau, among various other islands. The species also breeds throughout western Polynesia, including in Fiji, French Polynesia, and Tonga – though it does not breed in Niue. Surveys of the Fijian island of Rotuma, conducted in 1991 and 2018, suggest that the Pacific reef heron has recently colonized the island.

New Zealand is considered to be the southern limit of the Pacific reef heron's distribution. Despite being relatively uncommon, the herons are found throughout the country, though are most common in Northland.

== Behaviour and ecology ==
=== Breeding ===
The species lay clutches of eggs year-round in colonies in the jungle, between palms and mangroves or in cavities of old buildings. Two to three paled greenish-blue eggs are laid in nests constructed from branches and blossoms. Males and females share brooding tasks. They normally have a 28-day brood period. After chicks are hatched, parents provide approximately five weeks of support.

=== Food and feeding ===
Their food sources are made up predominantly of varieties of ocean-based fish, crustaceans, molluscs and worms. This heron hunts during both day and night, depending on the rise and fall of the tides. During the day, it hunts in shallow waters; standing motionless with wings open like an umbrella to reduce reflections and create shade which attracts fish.

== Conservation status ==
In New Zealand, the Pacific reef heron has the conservation status of "Nationally endangered". It has been classified as "Regionally Critical" in the Wellington Region.

== Gallery ==
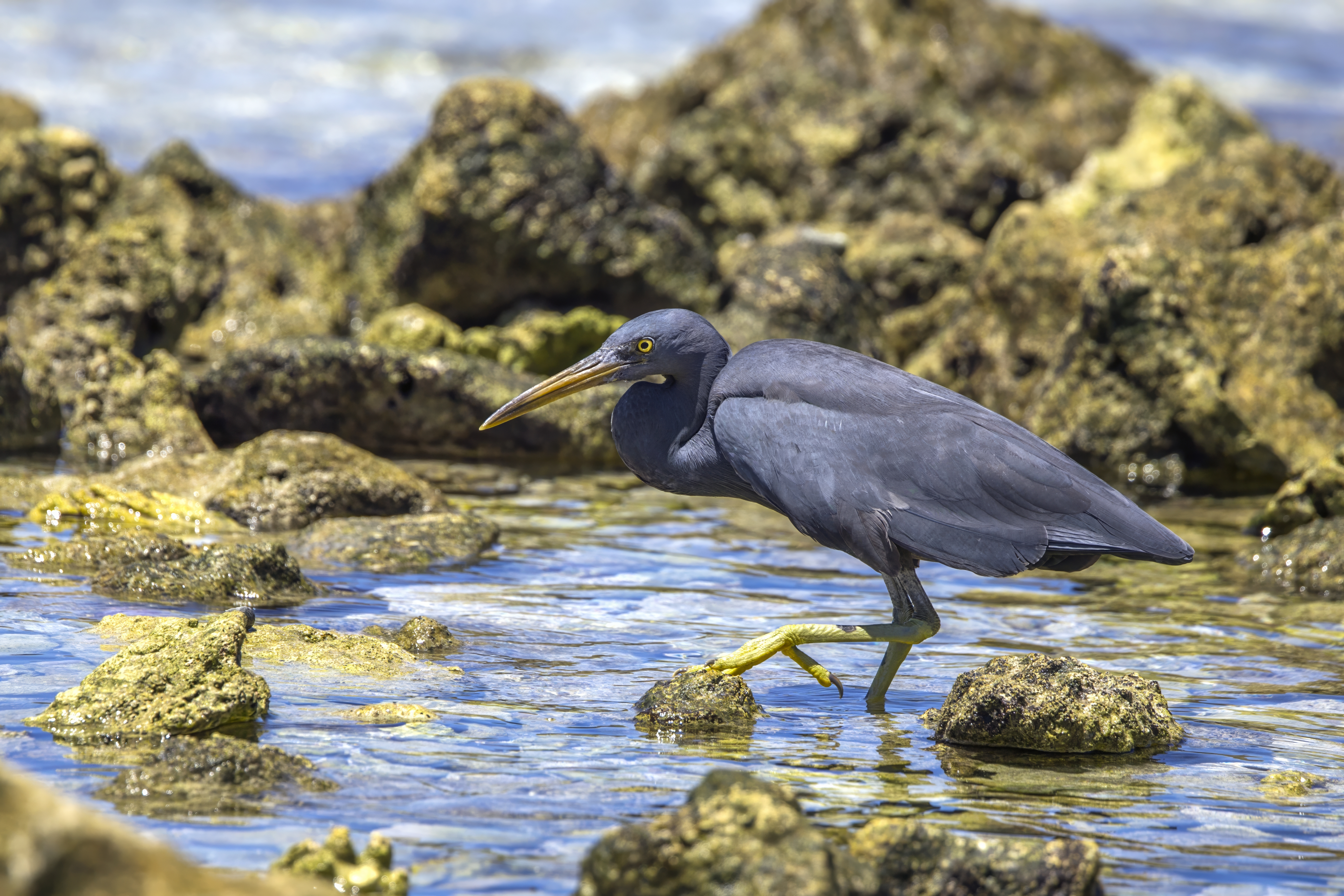
Dark morph, Rarotonga, Cook Islands

Mooloolaba, Australia

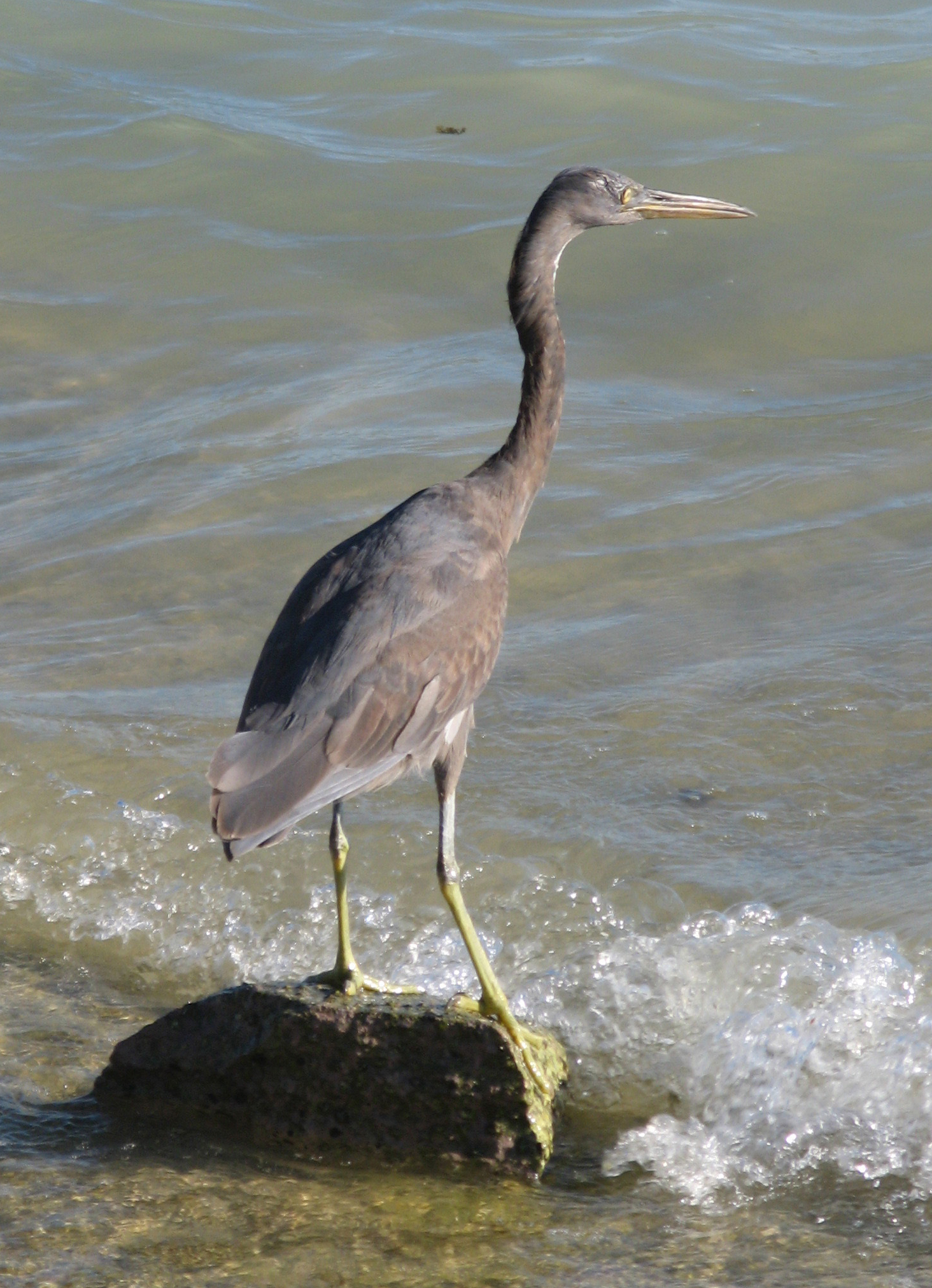
Juvenile dark morph, Coral Bay, Western Australia

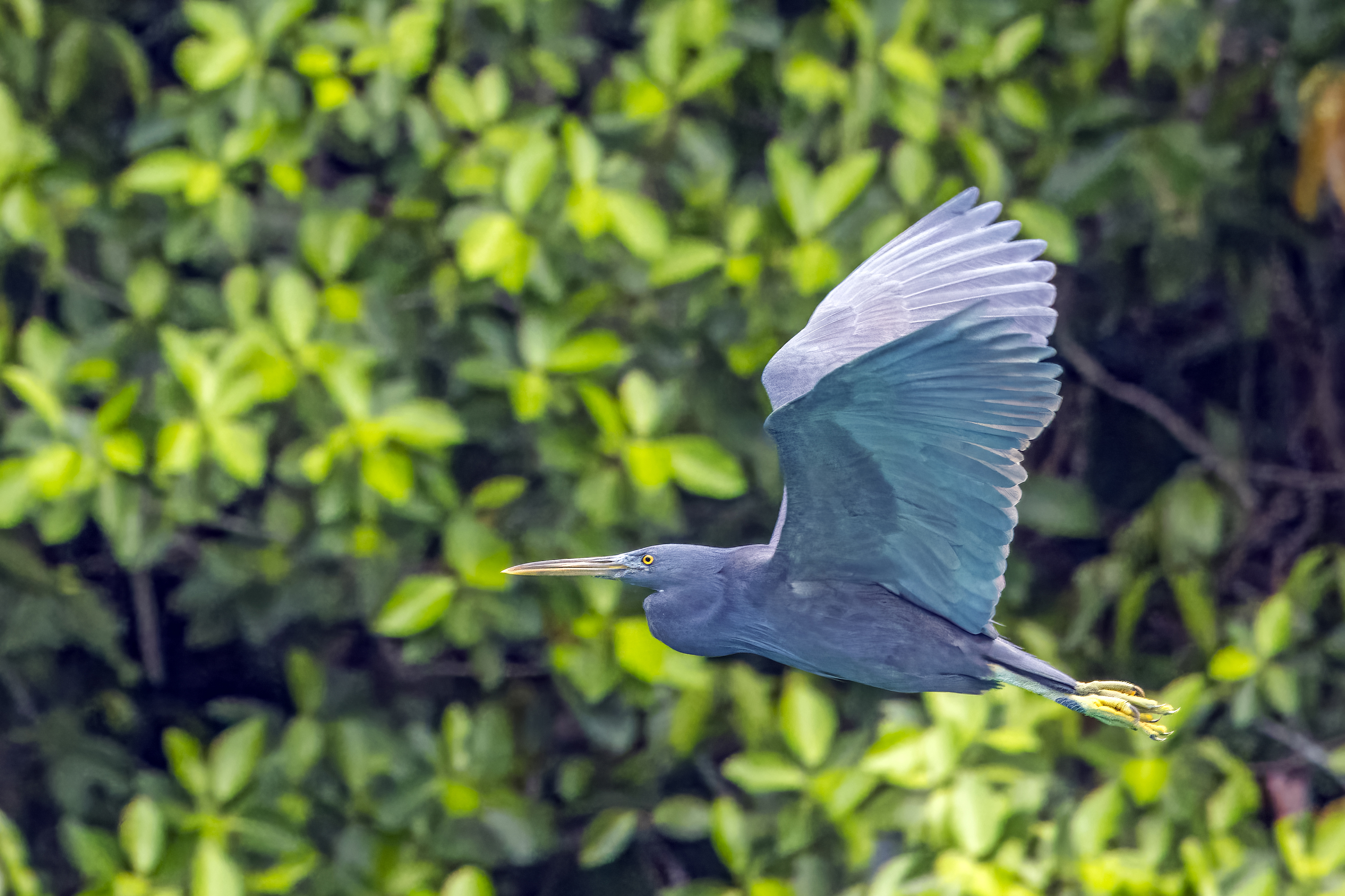
Dark morph, Palau

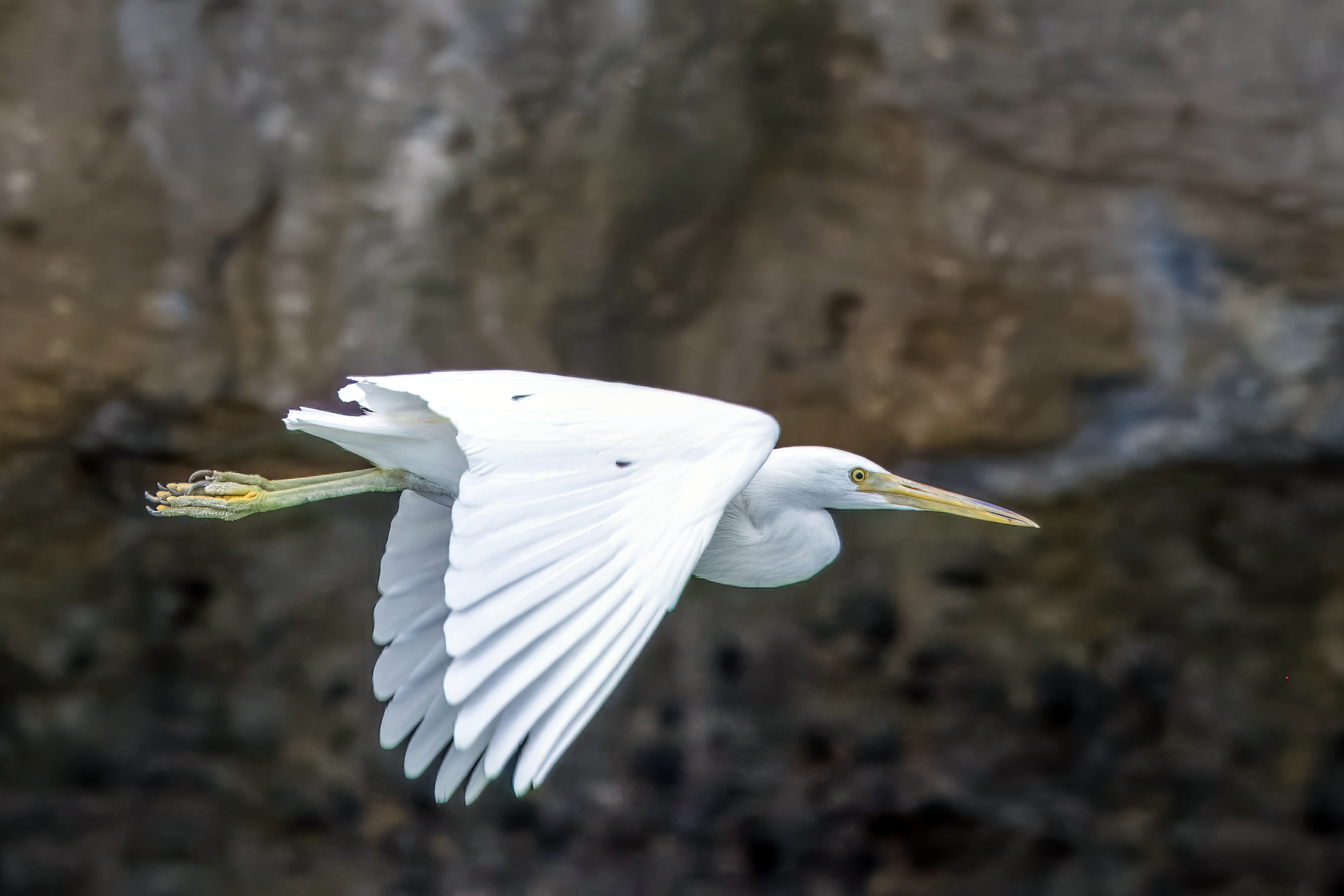
Light morph, Palau
