= List of birds of Mauritius =

This is a list of the bird species recorded in Mauritius. The avifauna of Mauritius include a total of 159 species, of which 28 are endemic, and 22 have been introduced by humans.

This list's taxonomic treatment (designation and sequence of orders, families and species) and nomenclature (common and scientific names) follow the conventions of The Clements Checklist of Birds of the World, 2022 edition. The family accounts at the beginning of each heading reflect this taxonomy, as do the species counts found in each family account. Introduced and accidental species are included in the total counts for Mauritius.

The following tags have been used to highlight several categories.

- (A) Accidental - a species that rarely or accidentally occurs in Mauritius
- (E) Endemic - a species endemic to Mauritius
- (I) Introduced - a species introduced to Mauritius as a consequence, direct or indirect, of human actions
- (Ex) Extirpated - a species that no longer occurs in Mauritius although populations exist elsewhere
- (X) Extinct - a species that was found on Mauritius but is no longer found alive globally

== Ducks, geese, and waterfowl ==
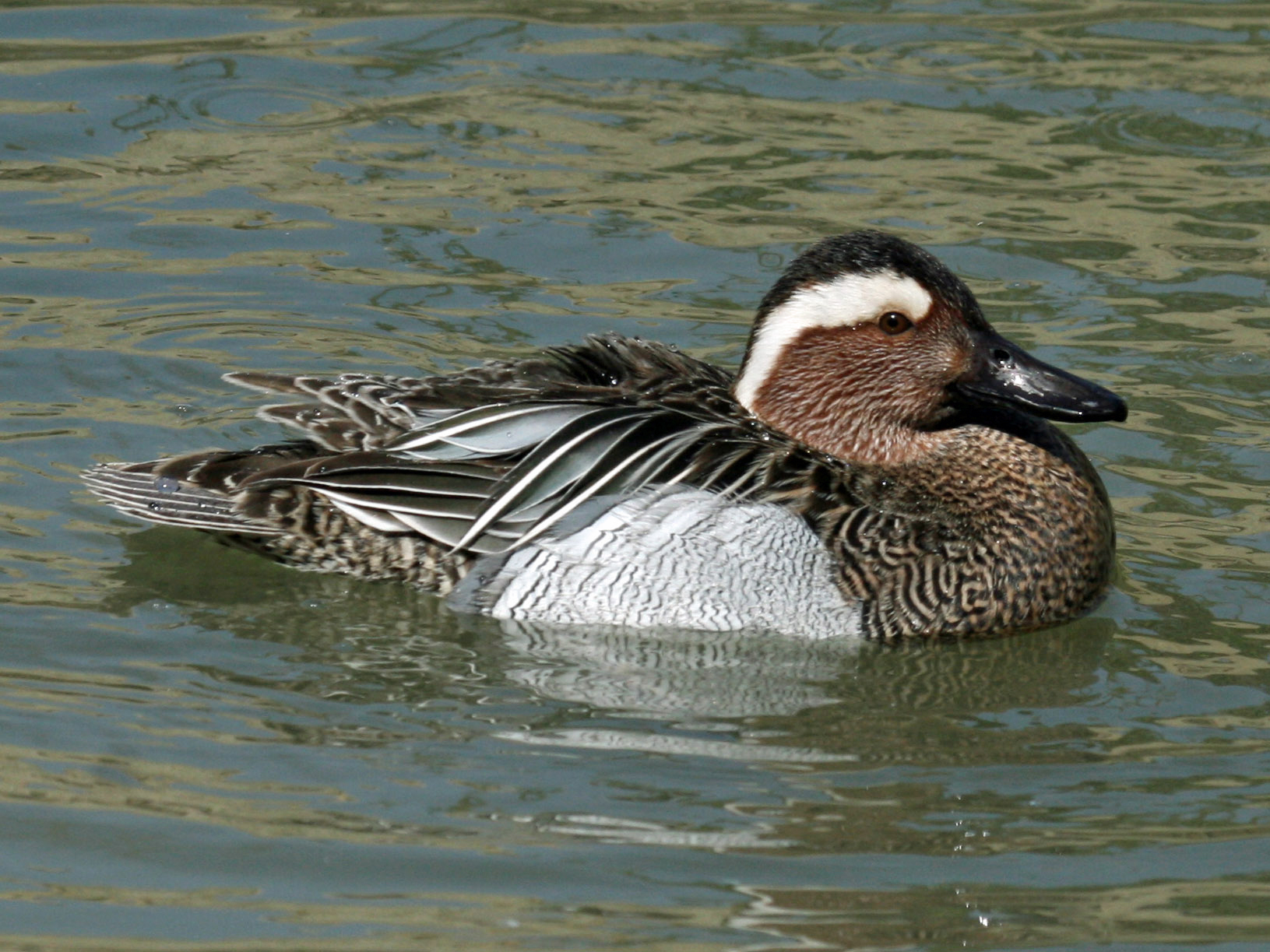
Garganey

Order: Anseriformes Family: Anatidae

Anatidae includes the ducks and most duck-like waterfowl, such as geese and swans. These birds are adapted to an aquatic existence with webbed feet, flattened bills, and feathers that are excellent at shedding water due to an oily coating.

- Mauritius shelduck, Alopochen mauritiana (X)
- Egyptian goose, Alopochen aegyptiaca (I)
- Garganey, Spatula querquedula
- Meller's duck, Anas melleri (I)
- Mallard, Anas platyrhynchos (I)
  - Domestic duck
- Mauritius duck, Anas theodori (X)
- White-faced whistling duck, Dendrocygna viduata
- Fulvous whistling duck, Dendrocygna bicolor (A)
- Muscovy duck, Cairina moschata (I)

== Guineafowl ==
Order: Galliformes Family: Numididae

Guineafowl are a group of African, seed-eating, ground-nesting birds that resemble partridges, but with featherless heads and spangled grey plumage.

- Helmeted guineafowl, Numida meleagris (I)

== Pheasants, grouse, and allies ==
Order: Galliformes Family: Phasianidae

The Phasianidae are a family of terrestrial birds. In general, they are plump (although they vary in size) and have broad, relatively short wings.

- Common pheasant, Phasianus colchicus (I)
- Chicken, Gallus gallus (I)
- Grey francolin, Ortygornis pondicerianus (I)
- Chinese francolin, Francolinus pintadeanus (I)
- Blue-breasted quail, Synoicus chinensis (I) (Ex)
- Common quail, Coturnix coturnix (I) (Ex)
- Jungle bush quail, Perdicula asiatica (I) (Ex)
- Madagascar partridge, Margaroperdix madagarensis (I)
- Red-legged partridge, Alectoris rufa (I)

== Flamingos ==
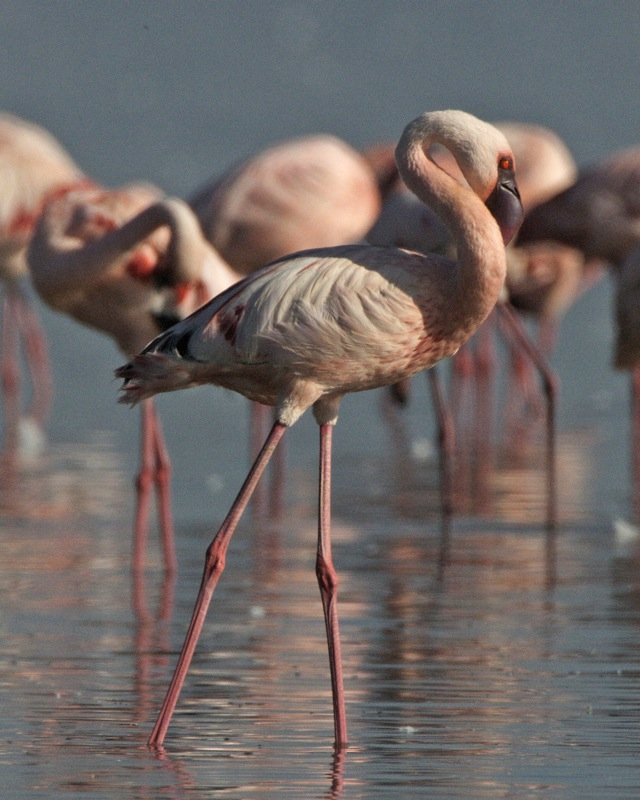
Lesser flamingo

Order: Phoenicopteriformes Family: Phoenicopteridae

Flamingos are gregarious wading birds, usually 1–1.5 m (3 ft 3 in – 4 ft 11 in), found in both the Western and Eastern Hemispheres. Flamingos filter-feed on shellfish and algae. Their oddly shaped beaks are specially adapted to separate mud and silt from the food they consume and, uniquely, are used upside-down.

- Greater flamingo, Phoenicopterus roseus (Ex)
- Lesser flamingo, Phoeniconaias minor (A)

== Pigeons and doves ==
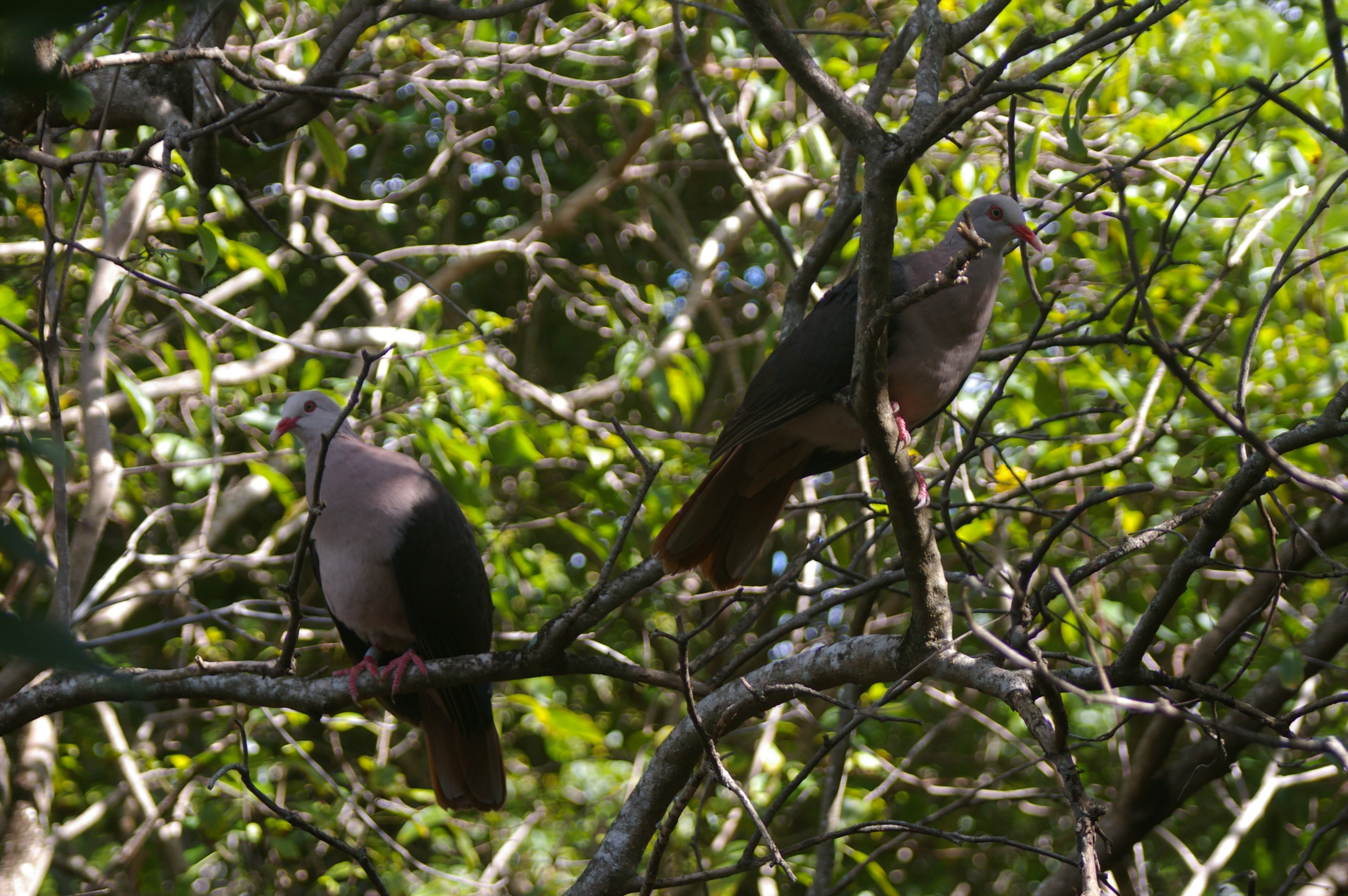
Pink pigeon pair on Île aux aigrettes, Mauritius

Order: Columbiformes Family: Columbidae

Pigeons and doves are stout-bodied birds with short necks and short slender bills with a fleshy cere.

- Rock dove, Columba livia (I)
- Mauritian wood pigeon, Columba thiriouxi (X)
- Pink pigeon, Nesoenas mayeri (E)
- Mauritian turtle dove, Nesoenas cicur (X)
- Rodrigues pigeon, Nesoenas rodericanus (X)
- Malagasy turtle dove, Nesoenas picturatus (I)
- Spotted dove, Spilopelia chinensis (I)
- Laughing dove, Spilopelia senegalensis (I)
- Zebra dove, Geopelia striata (I)
- Dodo, Raphus cucullatus (X)
- Rodrigues solitaire, Pezophaps solitaria (X)
- Mauritius blue pigeon, Alectroenas nitidissimus (X)
- Rodrigues blue pigeon, Alectroenas payandeei (X)

== Swifts ==
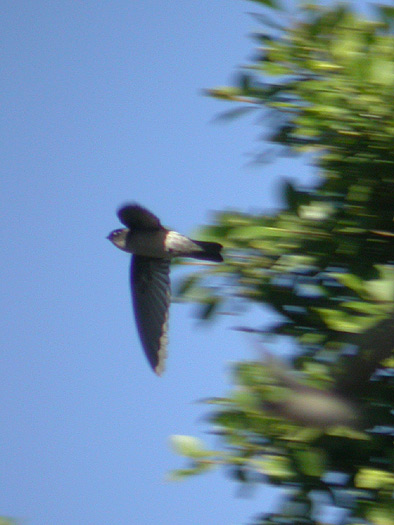
Mascarene swiftlet

Order: Apodiformes Family: Apodidae

Swifts are small birds which spend the majority of their lives flying. These birds have very short legs and never settle voluntarily on the ground, perching instead only on vertical surfaces. Many swifts have long swept-back wings which resemble a crescent or boomerang.

- White-throated needletail, Hirundapus caudacutus (A)
- Mascarene swiftlet, Aerodramus francicus
- Alpine swift, Tachypmarptis melba
- Common swift, Apus apus
- African black swift, Apus barbatus (A)

== Rails, gallinules and coots ==
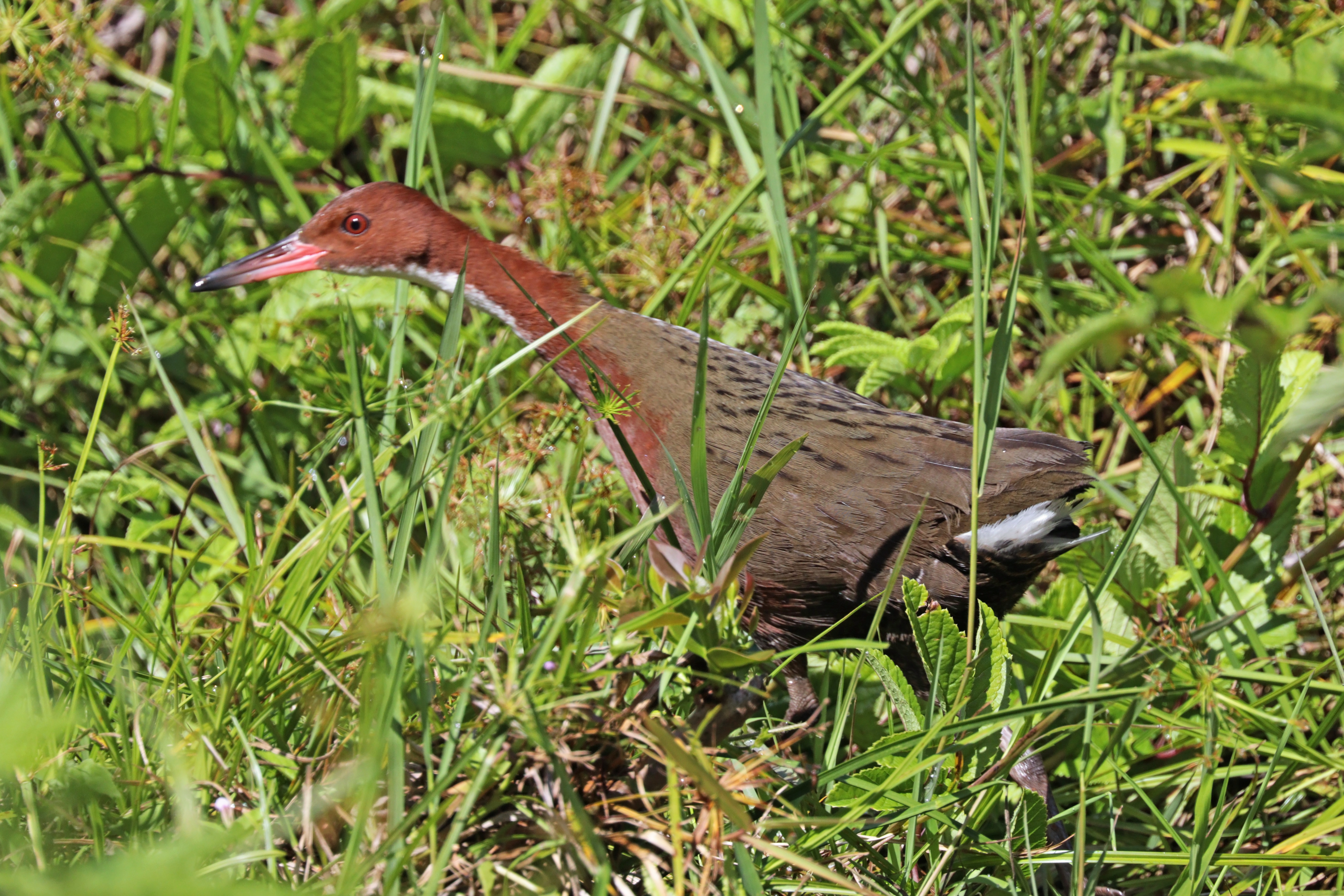
White-throated rail

Order: Gruiformes Family: Rallidae

Rallidae is a large family of small to medium-sized birds which includes the rails, crakes, coots and gallinules. Typically they inhabit dense vegetation in damp environments near lakes, swamps or rivers. In general they are shy and secretive birds, making them difficult to observe. Most species have strong legs and long toes which are well adapted to soft uneven surfaces. They tend to have short, rounded wings and to be weak fliers.

- White-throated rail, Dryolimnas cuvieri (Ex)
- Red rail, Aphanapteryx bonasia (X)
- Rodrigues rail, Erythromachus leguati (X)
- Common moorhen, Gallinula chloropus
- Mascarene coot, Fulica newtonii (X)
- Allen's gallinule, Porphyrio alleni (A)
- African swamphen, Porphyrio madagascariensis (Ex)

== Plovers and lapwings ==
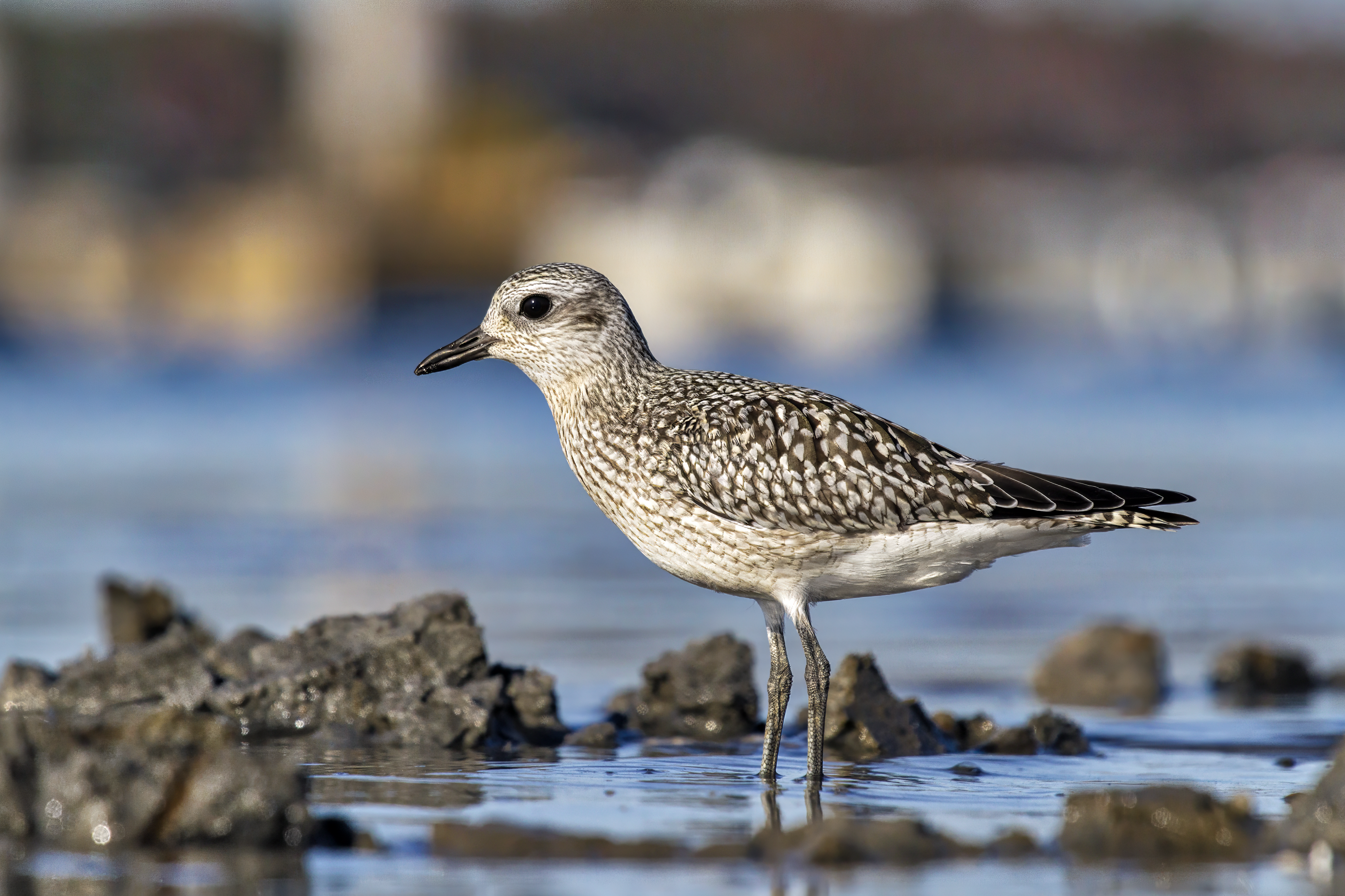
Grey plover

Order: Charadriiformes Family: Charadriidae

The family Charadriidae includes the plovers, dotterels and lapwings. They are small to medium-sized birds with compact bodies, short, thick necks and long, usually pointed, wings. They are found in open country worldwide, mostly in habitats near water.

- Grey plover, Pluvialis squatarola (A)
- Lesser sand plover, Charadrius mongolus
- Greater sand plover, Charadrius leschenaultii (A)
- Common ringed plover, Charadrius hiaticula
- Little ringed plover, Charadrius dubius

== Sandpipers and allies ==
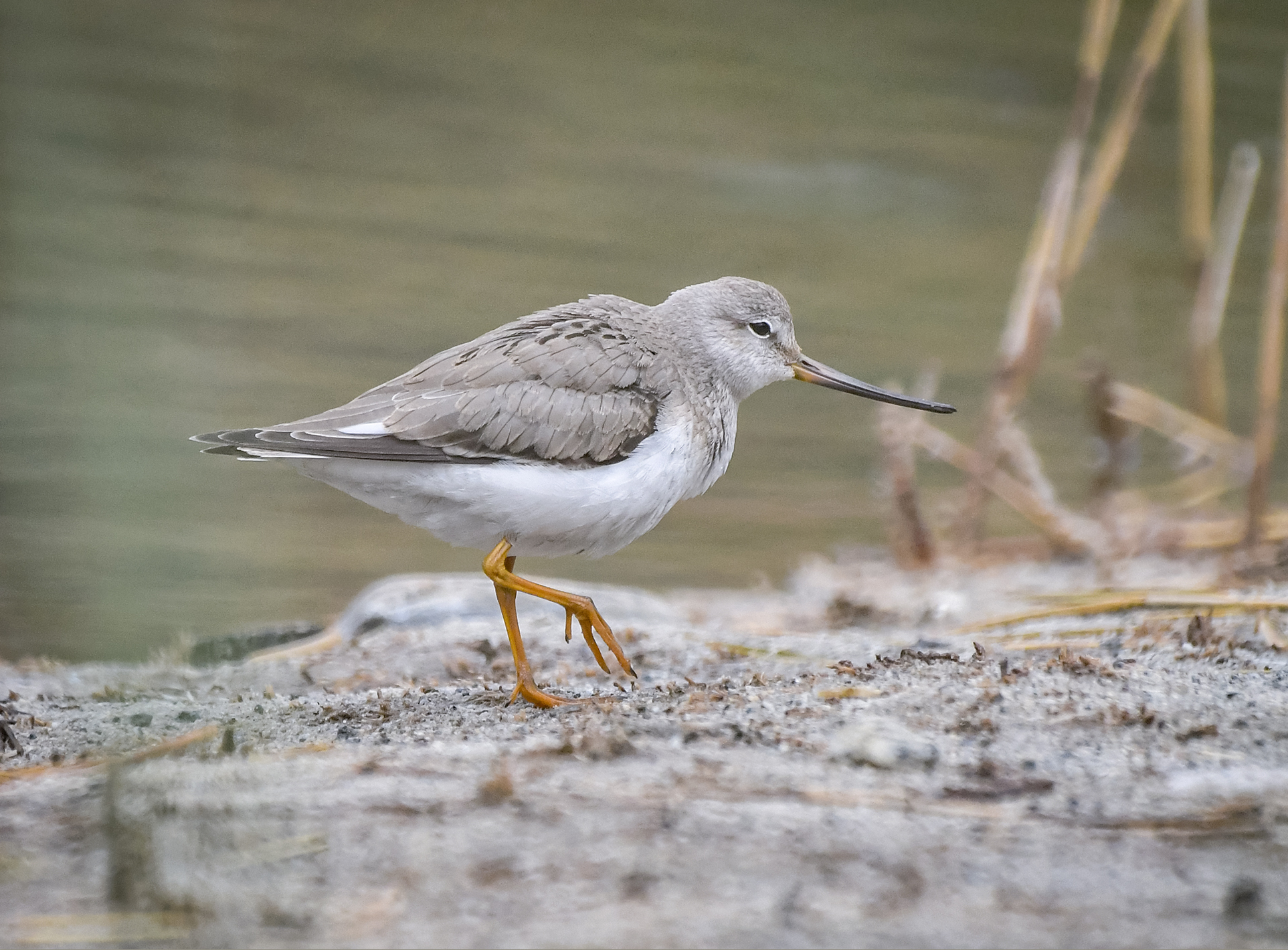
Terek sandpiper

Order: Charadriiformes Family: Scolopacidae

Scolopacidae is a large diverse family of small to medium-sized shorebirds including the sandpipers, curlews, godwits, shanks, tattlers, woodcocks, snipes, dowitchers and phalaropes. The majority of these species eat small invertebrates picked out of the mud or soil. Variation in length of legs and bills enables multiple species to feed in the same habitat, particularly on the coast, without direct competition for food.

- Eurasian whimbrel, Numenius phaeopus (A)
- Eurasian curlew, Numenius arquata (A)
- Bar-tailed godwit, Limosa lapponica (A)
- Ruddy turnstone, Arenaria interpres (A)
- Great knot, Calidris tenuirostris
- Ruff, Calidris pugnax
- Broad-billed sandpiper, Calidris falcinellus
- Sharp-tailed sandpiper, Calidris acuminata
- Curlew sandpiper, Calidris ferruginea (A)
- Sanderling, Calidris alba (A)
- Little stint, Calidris minuta
- Pectoral sandpiper, Calidris melanotos
- Terek sandpiper, Xenus cinereus (A)
- Common sandpiper, Actitis hypoleucos (A)
- Green sandpiper, Tringa ochropus
- Grey-tailed tattler, Tringa brevipes
- Common greenshank, Tringa nebularia (A)
- Marsh sandpiper, Tringa stagnatilis
- Wood sandpiper, Tringa glareola

== Buttonquail ==
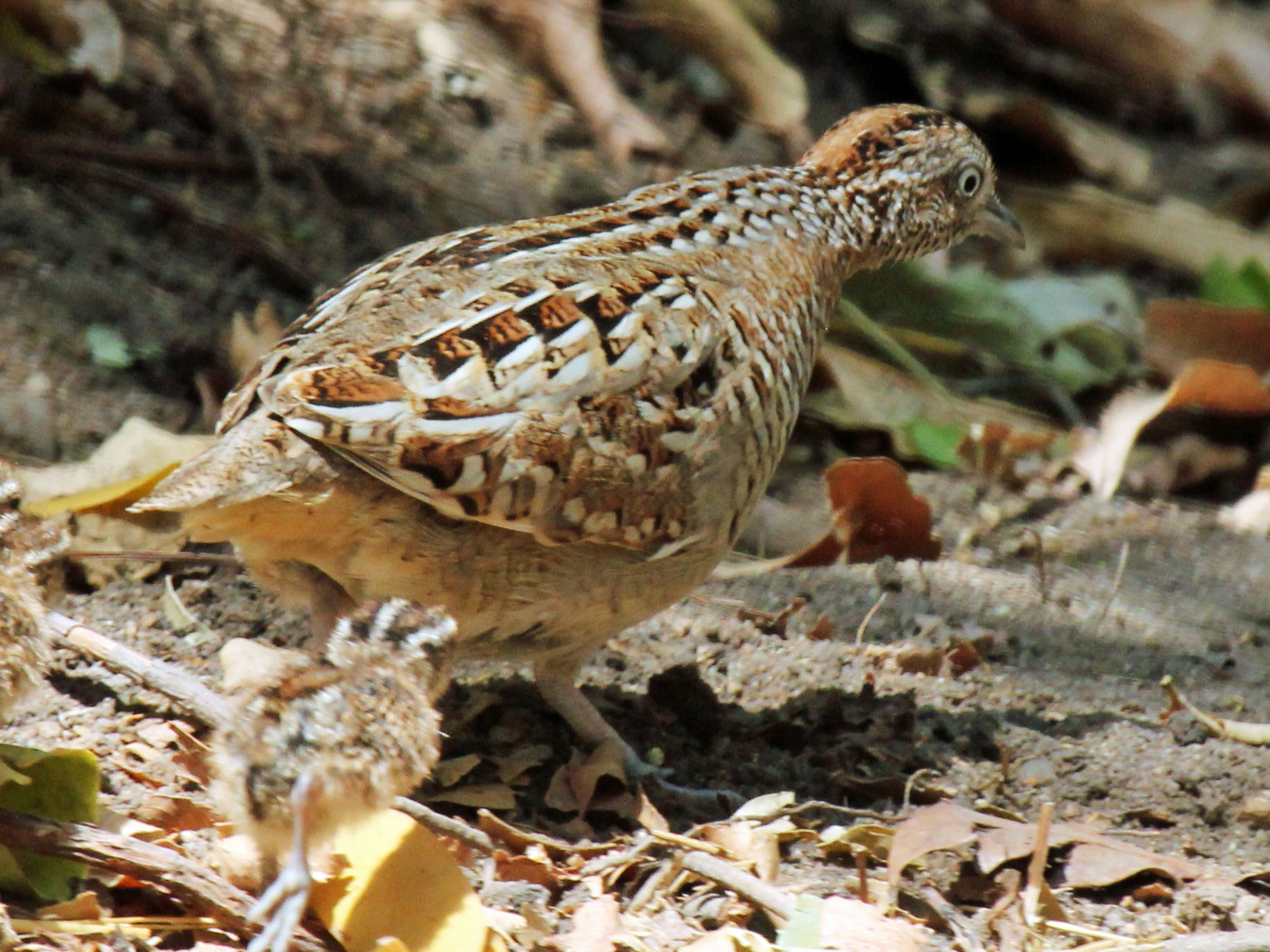
Madagascar buttonquail

Order: Charadriiformes Family: Turnicidae

The buttonquail are small, drab, running birds which resemble the true quails. The female is the brighter of the sexes and initiates courtship. The male incubates the eggs and tends the young.

- Madagascar buttonquail, Turnix nigricollis

== Crab-plover ==
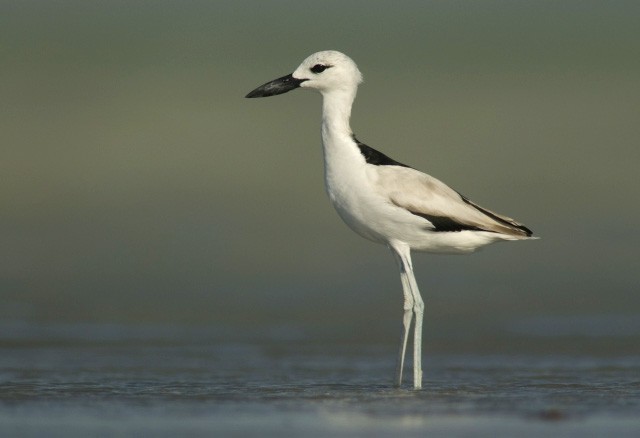
Crab-plover

Order: Charadriiformes Family: Dromadidae

The crab-plover is related to the waders. It resembles a plover but with very long grey legs and a strong heavy black bill similar to a tern's. It has black-and-white plumage, a long neck, partially webbed feet, and a bill designed for eating crabs.

- Crab-plover, Dromas ardeola (A)

== Pratincoles and coursers ==
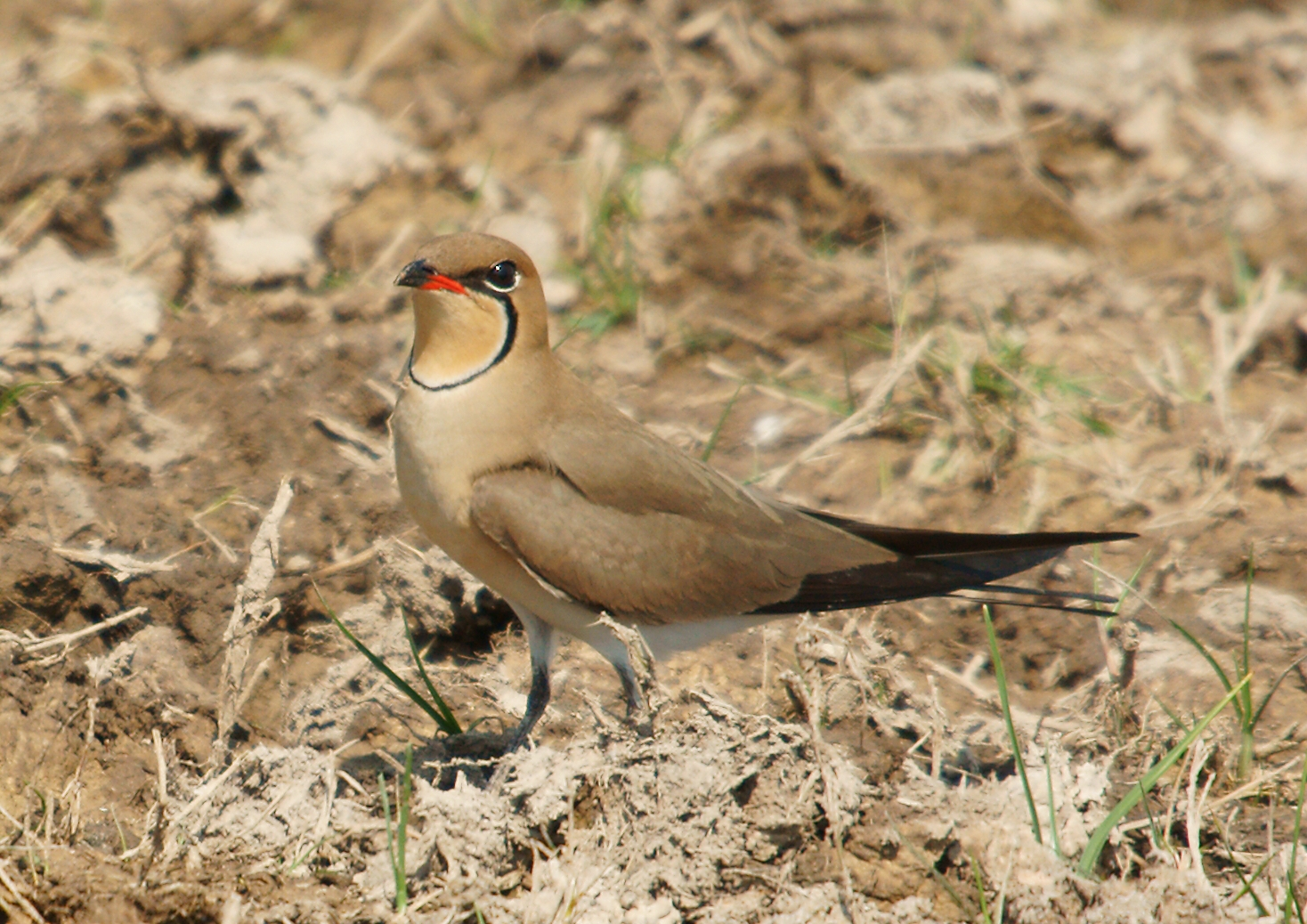
Collared pratincole

Order: Charadriiformes Family: Glareolidae

Glareolidae is a family of wading birds comprising the pratincoles, which have short legs, long pointed wings and long forked tails, and the coursers, which have long legs, short wings and long, pointed bills which curve downwards. There are 17 species worldwide and 3 species which occur in Mauritius.

- Collared pratincole, Glareola pratincola (A)
- Oriental pratincole, Glareola maldivarum (A)
- Madagascar pratincole, Glareola ocularis

== Skuas and jaegers ==
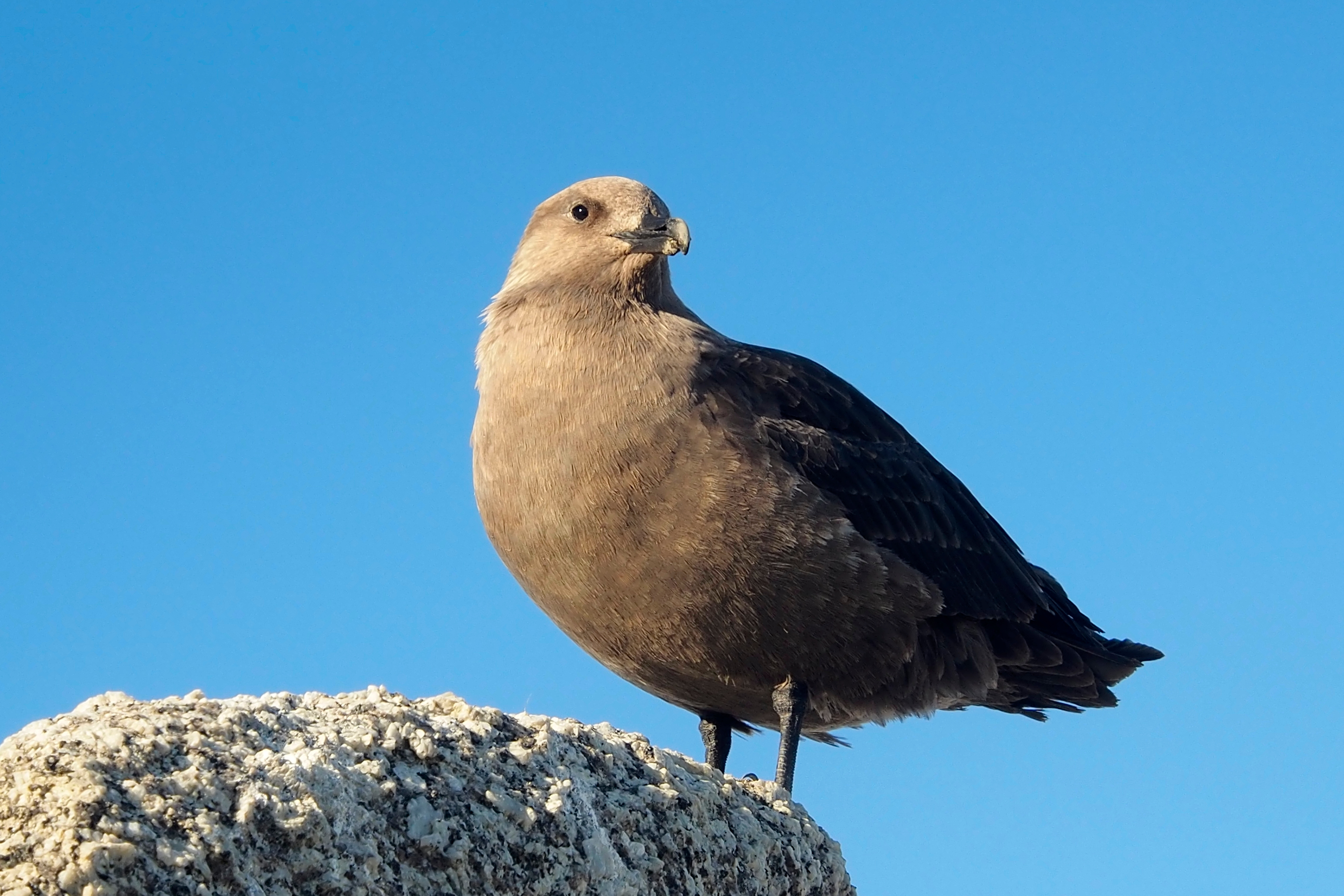
South polar skua

Order: Charadriiformes Family: Stercorariidae

The family Stercorariidae are, in general, medium to large birds, typically with grey or brown plumage, often with white markings on the wings. They nest on the ground in temperate and arctic regions and are long-distance migrants.

- Brown skua, Stercorarius antarcticus
- South polar skua, Stercorarius maccormicki
- Pomarine skua, Stercorarius pomarinus

== Gulls, terns, and skimmers ==
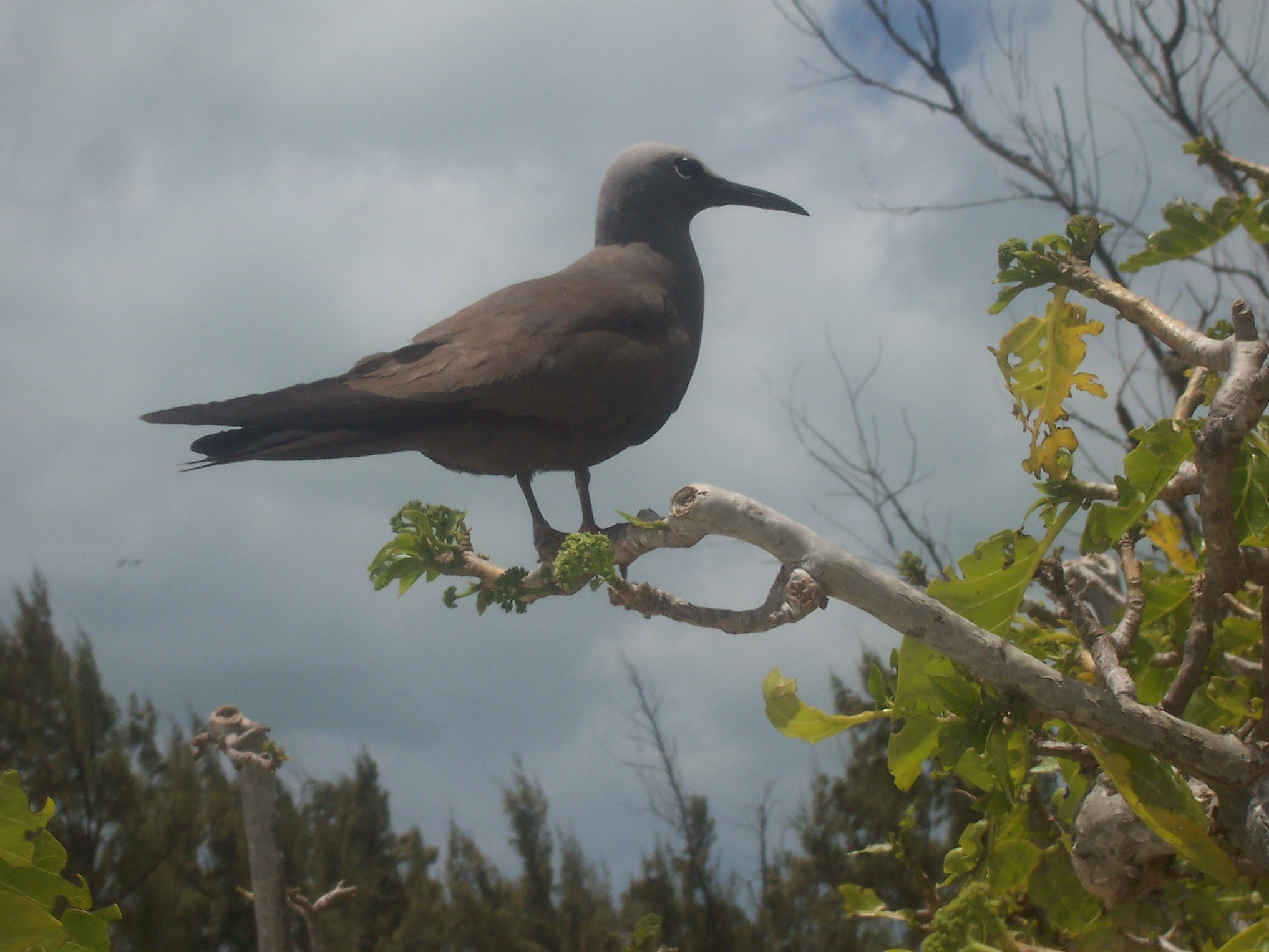
Lesser noddy

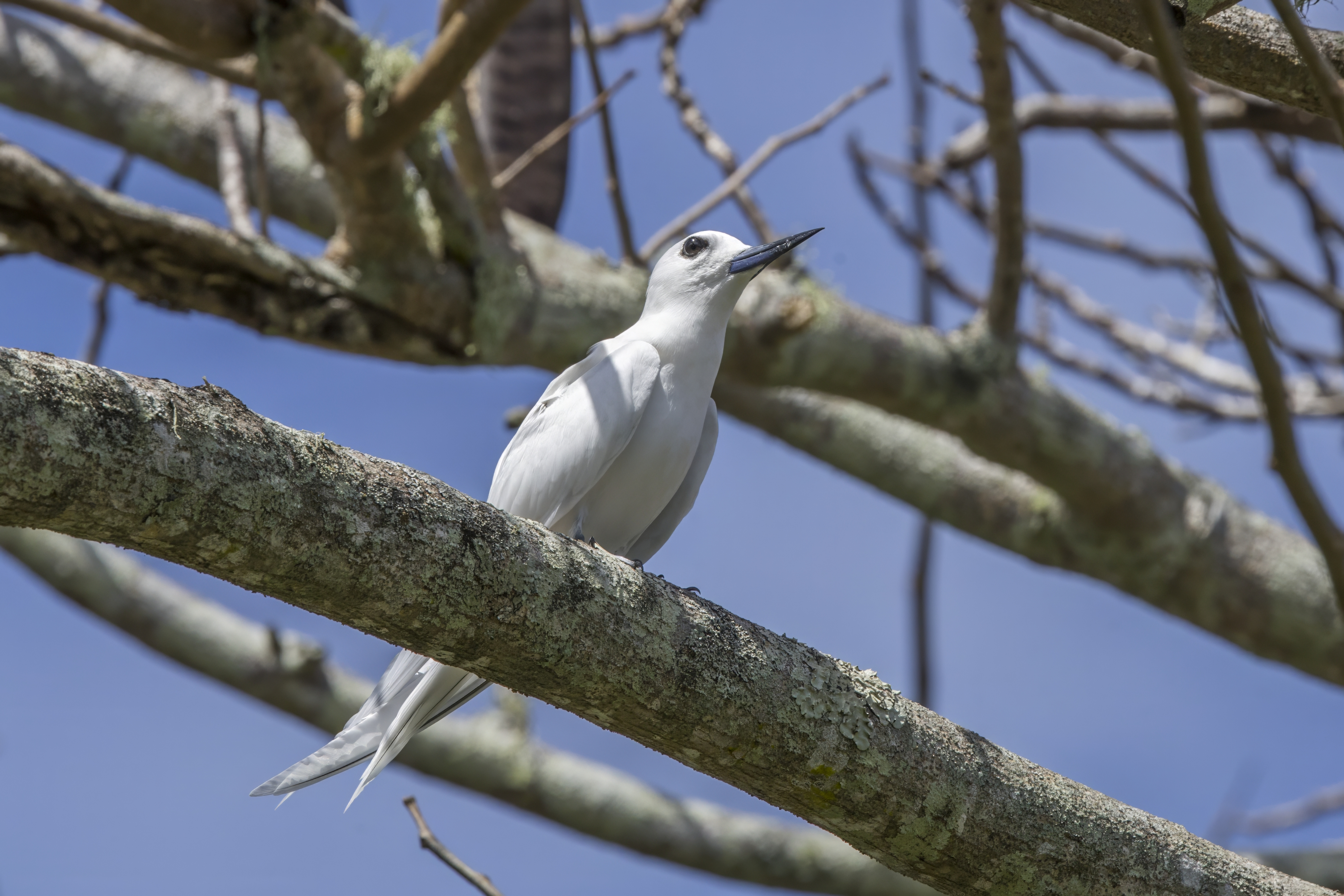
White tern

Order: Charadriiformes Family: Laridae

Laridae is a family of medium to large seabirds, the gulls, terns, and skimmers. Gulls are typically grey or white, often with black markings on the head or wings. They have stout, longish bills and webbed feet. Terns are a group of generally medium to large seabirds typically with grey or white plumage, often with black markings on the head. Most terns hunt fish by diving but some pick insects off the surface of fresh water. Gulls and terns are generally long-lived birds, with several species known to live in excess of 30 years.

- Brown noddy, Anous stolidus (A)
- Lesser noddy, Anous tenuirostris (A)
- Black noddy, Anous minutus
- White tern, Gygis alba (A)
- Sooty tern, Onychoprion fuscatus (A)
- Bridled tern, Onychoprion anaethetus
- Little tern, Sternula albifrons
- White-winged tern, Chlidonias leucopterus
- Roseate tern, Sterna dougallii (A)
- Common tern, Sterna hirundo (A)
- Great crested tern, Thalasseus bergii
- Lesser crested tern, Thalasseus bengalensis

== Tropicbirds ==
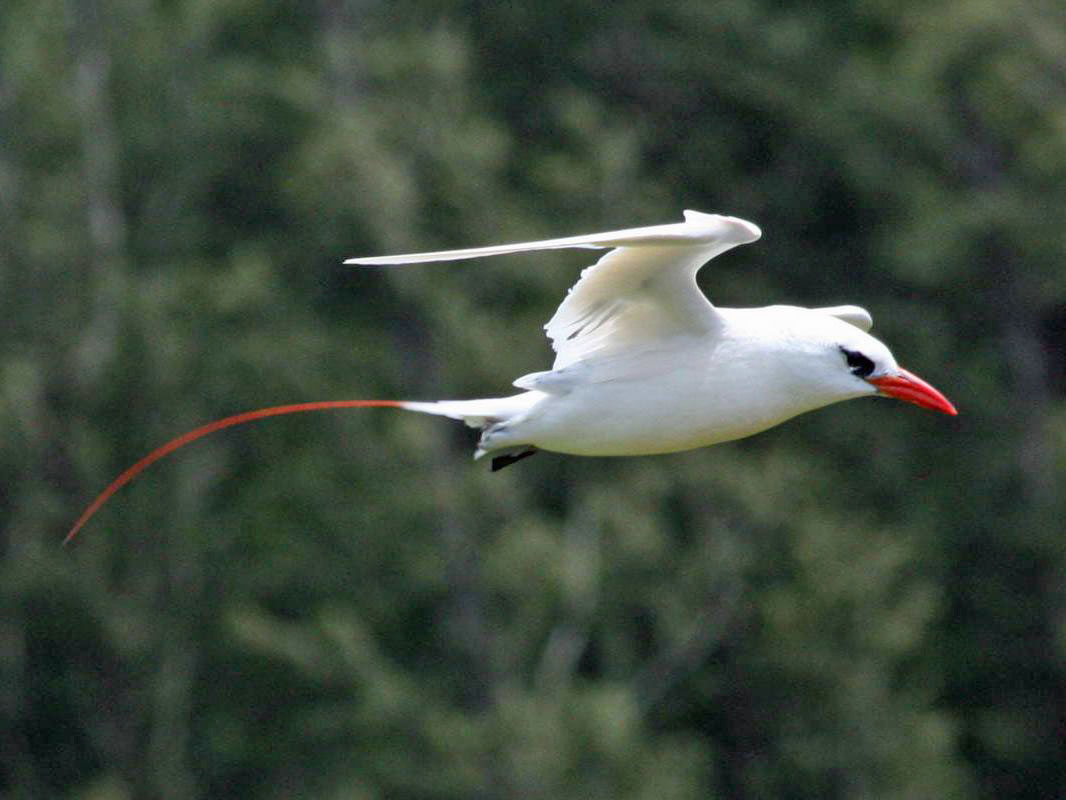
Red-tailed tropicbird

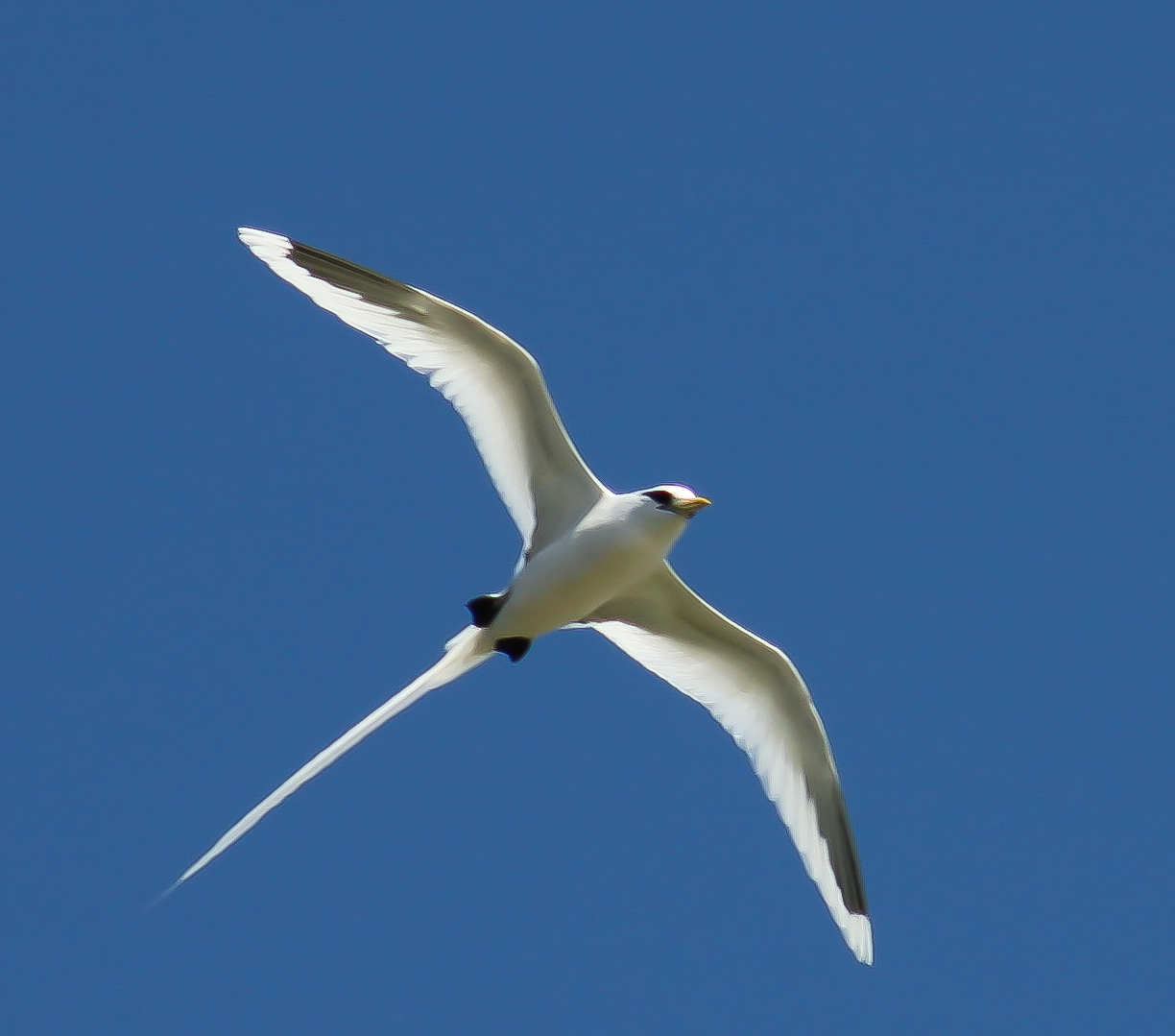
White-tailed tropicbird

Order: Phaethontiformes Family: Phaethontidae

Tropicbirds are slender white birds of tropical oceans, with exceptionally long central tail feathers. Their heads and long wings have black markings.

- White-tailed tropicbird, Phaethon lepturus (A)
- Red-tailed tropicbird, Phaethon rubricauda (A)

== Albatrosses ==
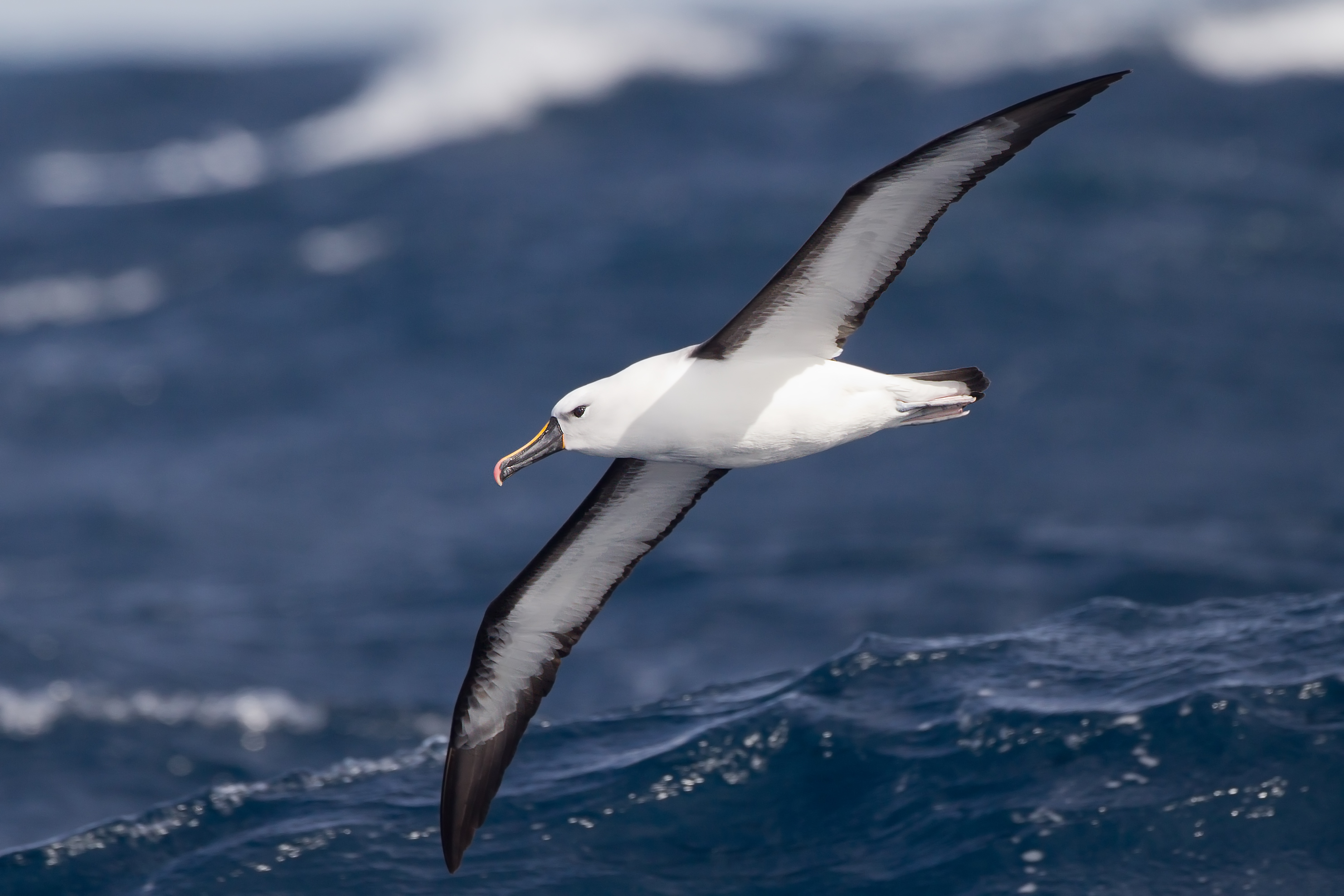
Yellow-nosed albatross

Order: Procellariiformes Family: Diomedeidae

The albatrosses are among the largest of flying birds, and the great albatrosses from the genus Diomedea have the largest wingspans of any extant birds. There are 21 species worldwide and 5 species which occur in Mauritius.

- Yellow-nosed albatross, Thalassarche chlororhynchos (A)
- White-capped albatross, Thalassarche cauta
- Sooty albatross, Phoebetria fusca
- Light-mantled albatross, Phoebetria palpebrata
- Wandering albatross, Diomedea exulans

== Southern storm petrels ==
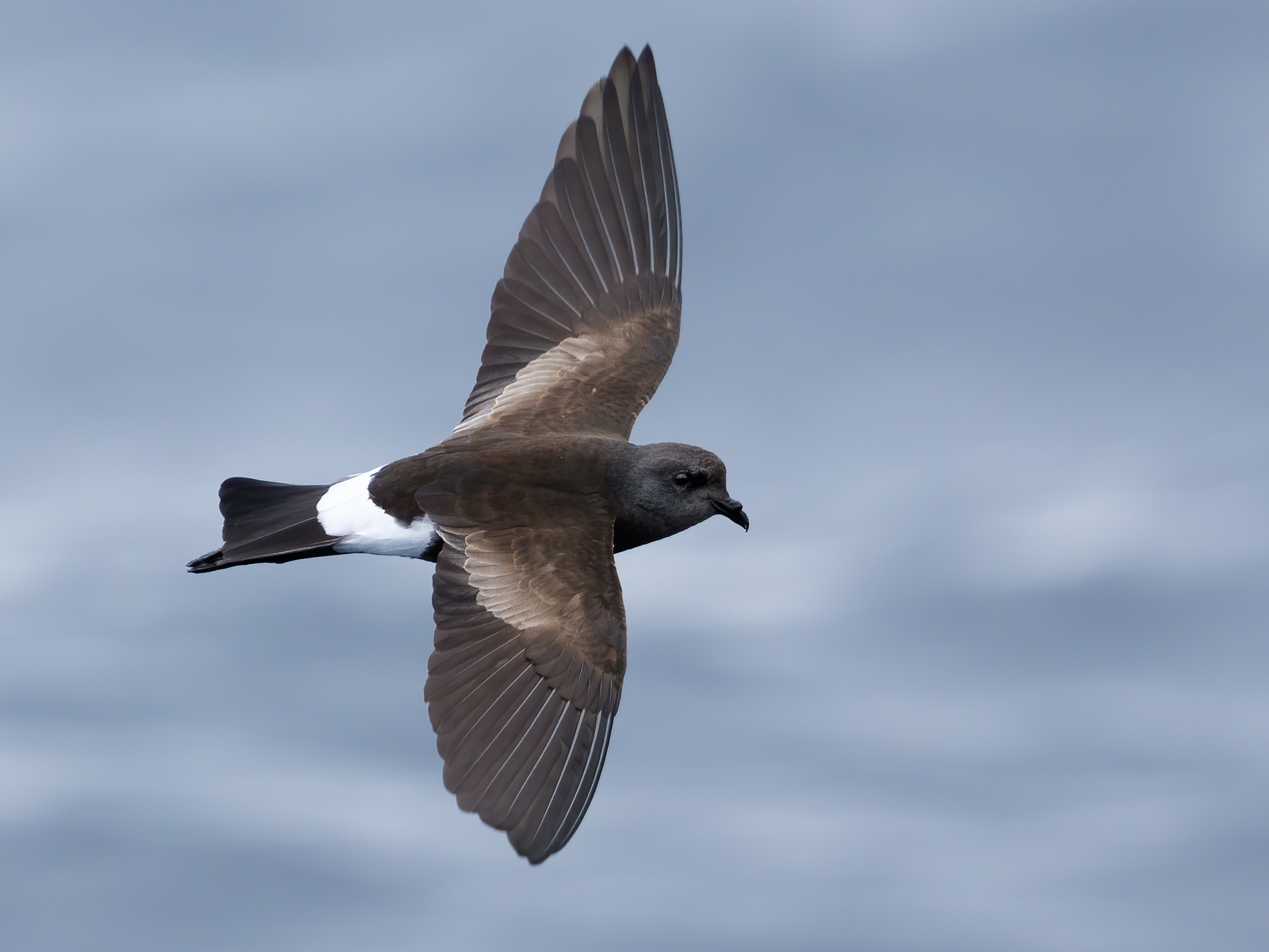
Wilson's storm petrel

Order: Procellariiformes Family: Oceanitidae

The southern storm petrels are relatives of the petrels and are the smallest seabirds. They feed on planktonic crustaceans and small fish picked from the surface, typically while hovering. The flight is fluttering and sometimes bat-like.

- Wilson's storm petrel, Oceanites oceanicus (A)
- White-faced storm petrel, Pelagodroma marina
- White-bellied storm petrel, Fregetta grallaria
- Black-bellied storm petrel, Fregetta tropica

== Shearwaters and petrels ==
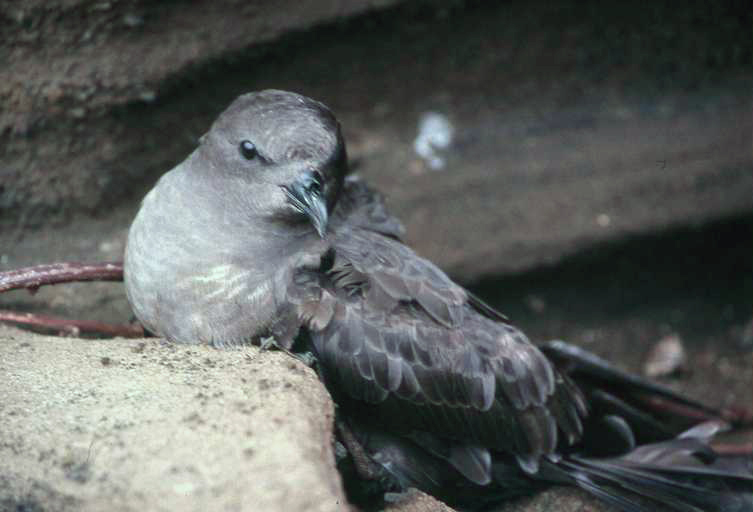
Trinidade petrel

Order: Procellariiformes Family: Procellariidae

The procellariids are the main group of medium-sized shearwaters and petrels, characterised by united nostrils with medium septum and a long outer functional primary.

- Bulwer's petrel, Bulweria bulwerii (A)
- Southern giant petrel, Macronectes giganteus (A)
- Cape petrel, Daption capense
- Great-winged petrel, Pterodroma macroptera
- Trindade petrel, Pterodroma arminjoniana (A)
- Herald petrel, Pterodroma heraldica
- Soft-plumaged petrel, Pterodroma mollis
- Barau's petrel, Pterodroma baraui
- Fairy prion, Pachyptila turtur
- Antarctic prion, Pachyptila desolata
- Slender-billed prion, Pachyptila belcheri
- Mascarene petrel, Pseudobulweria aterrima
- Cory's shearwater, Ardenna diomedea
- Flesh-footed shearwater, Ardenna carneipes
- Wedge-tailed shearwater, Ardenna pacificus (A)
- Short-tailed shearwater, Ardenna tenuirostris
- Tropical shearwater, Puffinus bailloni

== Frigatebirds ==
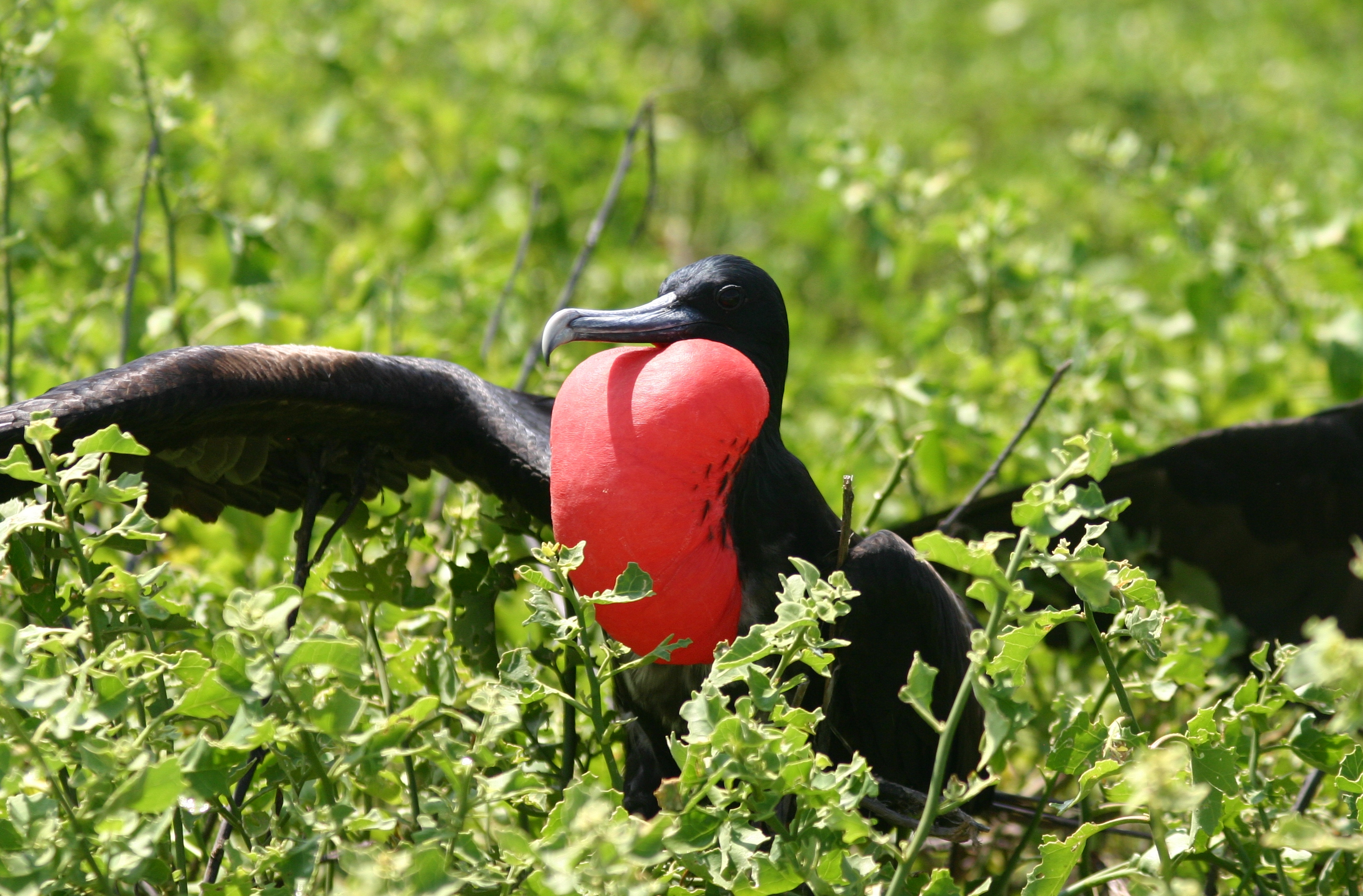
Great frigatebird

Order: Suliformes Family: Fregatidae

Frigatebirds are large seabirds usually found over tropical oceans. They are large, black-and-white or completely black, with long wings and deeply forked tails. The males have coloured inflatable throat pouches. They do not swim or walk and cannot take off from a flat surface. Having the largest wingspan-to-body-weight ratio of any bird, they are essentially aerial, able to stay aloft for more than a week.

- Lesser frigatebird, Fregata ariel
- Great frigatebird, Fregata minor

== Boobies and gannets ==
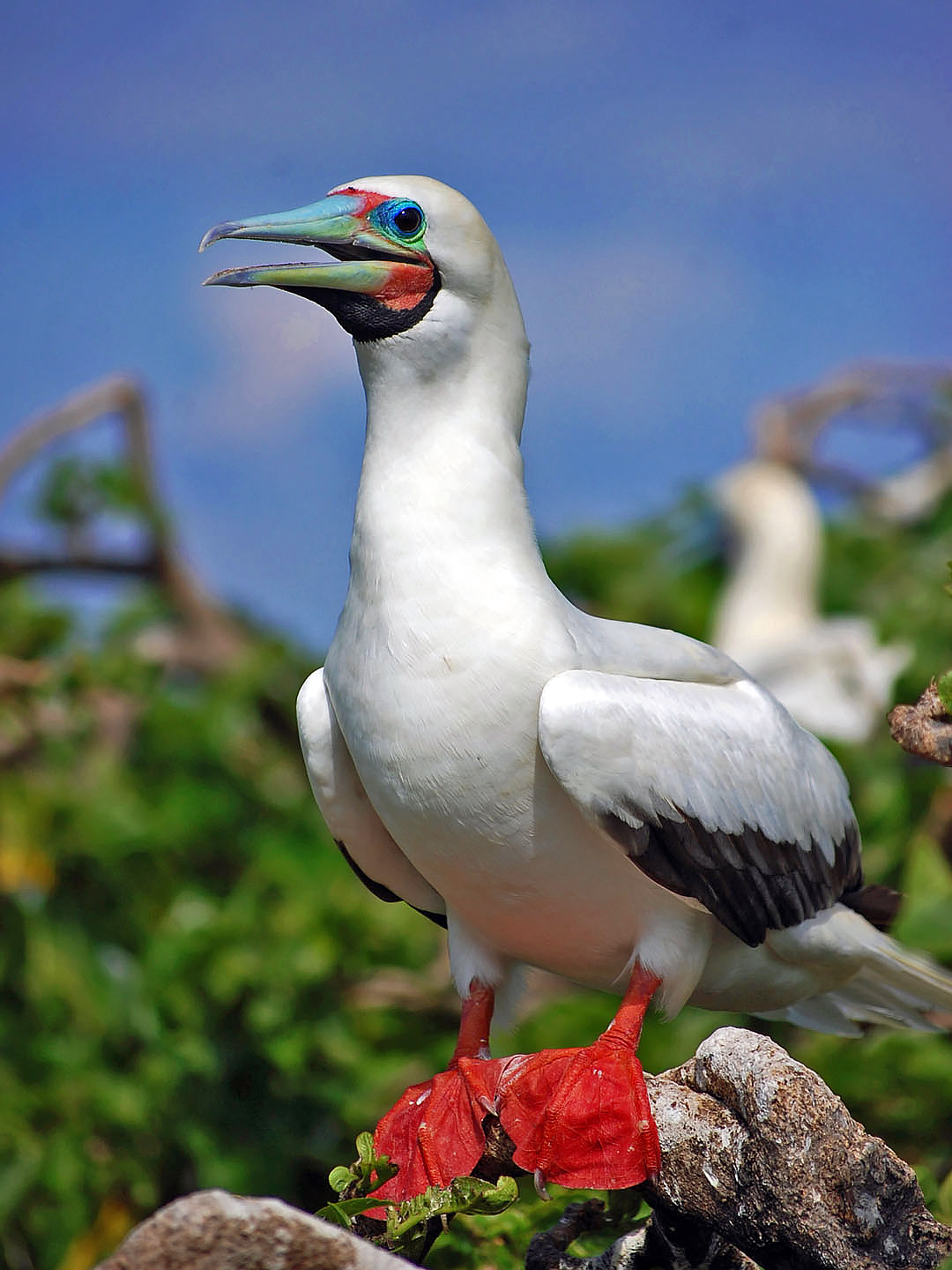
Red-footed booby

Order: Suliformes Family: Sulidae

The sulids comprise the gannets and boobies. Both groups are medium to large coastal seabirds that plunge-dive for fish.

- Masked booby, Sula dactylatra (A)
- Brown booby, Sula leucogaster
- Red-footed booby, Sula sula (A)
- Abbott's booby, Papasula abbotti
  - Mascarene booby, Papasula abbotti nelsoni (X)
- Australasian gannet, Morus serrator (Ex)

== Herons, egrets and bitterns ==
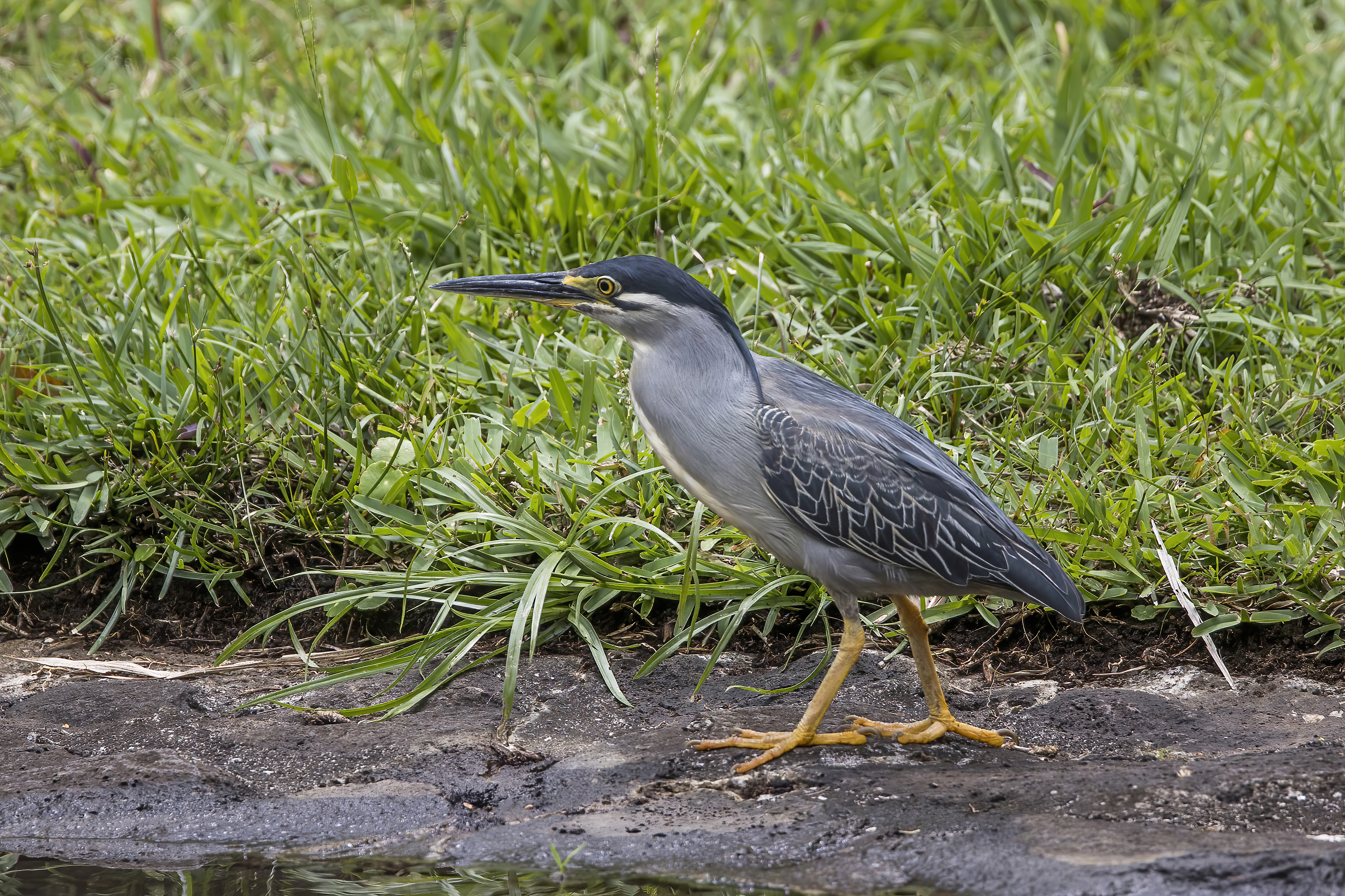
Little heron on Mauritius

Order: Pelecaniformes Family: Ardeidae

The family Ardeidae contains the bitterns, herons and egrets. Herons and egrets are medium to large wading birds with long necks and legs. Bitterns tend to be shorter necked and more wary. Members of Ardeidae fly with their necks retracted, unlike other long-necked birds like storks, ibises, spoonbills.

- Great egret, Casmerodius albus (A)
- Intermediate egret, Ardea intermedia (A)
- Little egret, Egretta garzetta
- Western cattle egret, Bubulcus ibis
- Dimorphic egret, Egretta dimorpha (A)
- Squacco heron, Ardeola ralloides (A)
- Little heron, Butorides atricapilla
- Mauritius night heron, Nycticorax mauritianus (X)
- Rodrigues night heron, Nycticorax megacephalus (X)
- Black-crowned night heron, Nycticorax nycticorax

== Ibises and spoonbills ==
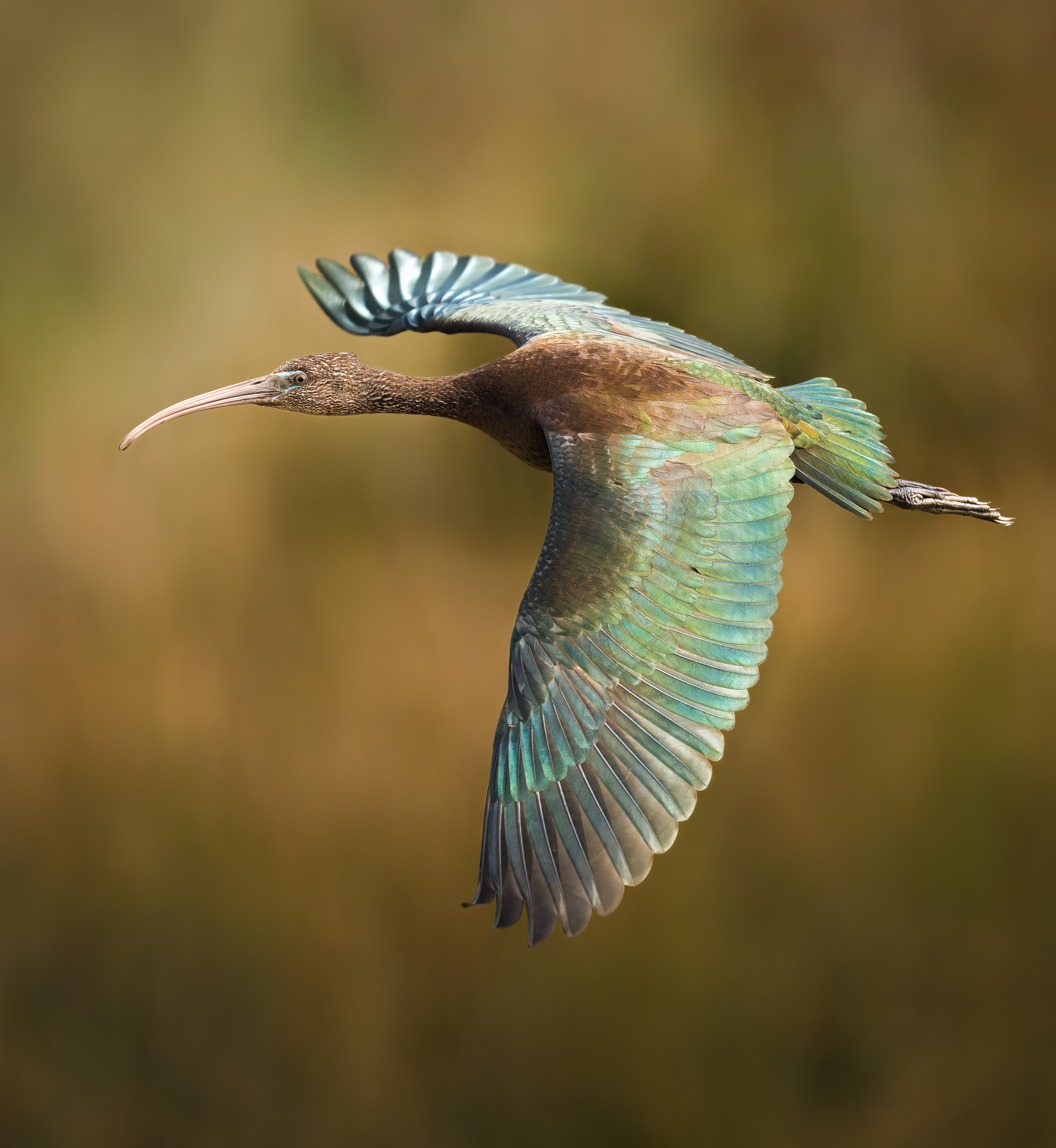
Glossy ibis

Order: Pelecaniformes Family: Threskiornithidae

Threskiornithidae is a family of large wading birds which includes ibises and spoonbills. They have long, broad wings with 11 primary and about 20 secondary feathers. They are strong fliers and despite their size and weight, very capable soarers.

- Glossy ibis, Plegadis falcinellus (A)

== Hawks, eagles, and kites ==
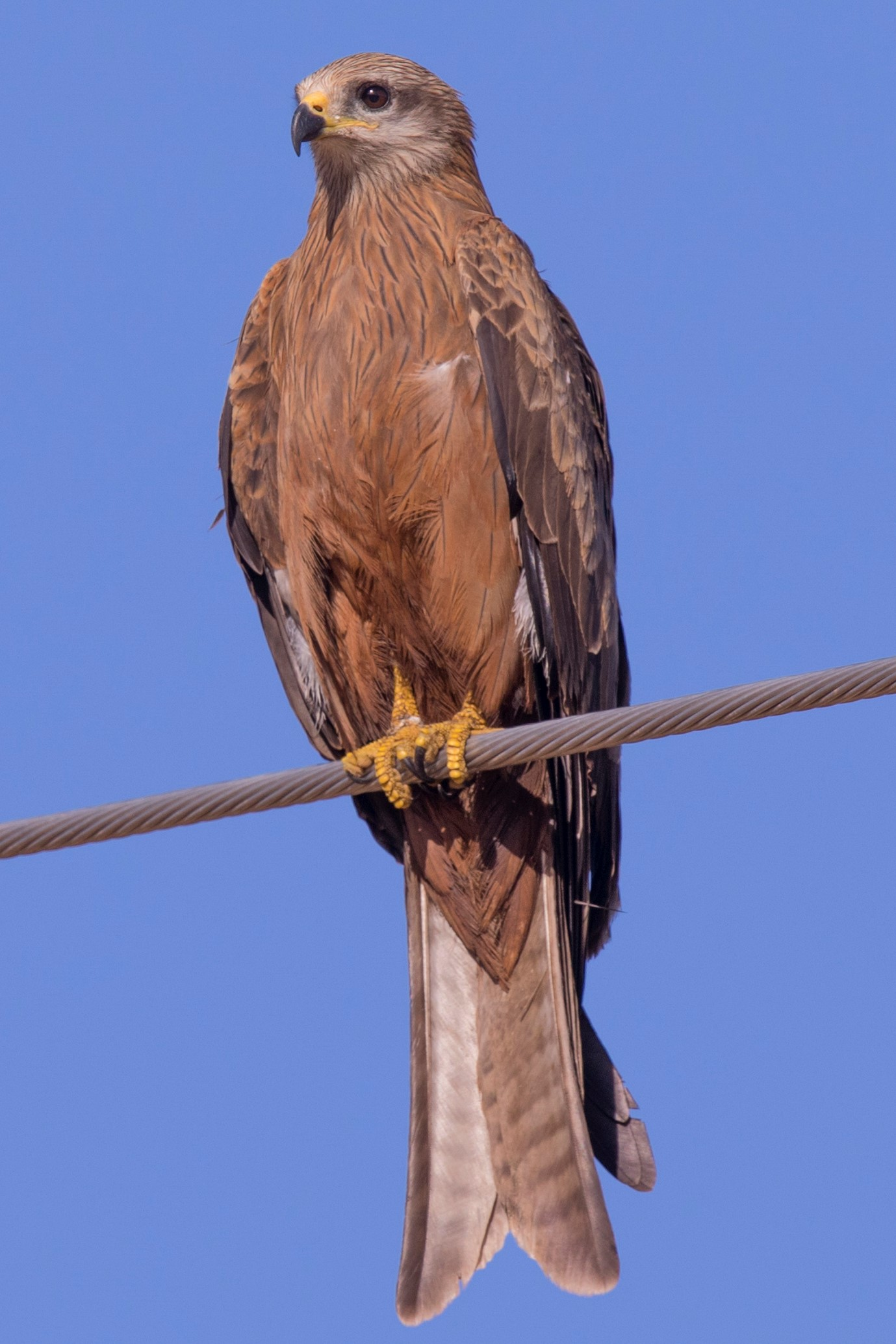
Black kite

Order: Accipitriformes Family: Accipitridae

Accipitridae is a family of birds of prey, which includes hawks, eagles, kites, harriers and Old World vultures. These birds have powerful hooked beaks for tearing flesh from their prey, strong legs, powerful talons and keen eyesight.

- Western marsh harrier, Circus aeruginosus (A)
- Reunion harrier, Circus maillardi (Ex)
- Black kite, Milvus migrans (A)

== Owls ==
Order: Strigiformes Family: Strigidae

The typical owls are small to large solitary nocturnal birds of prey. They have large forward-facing eyes and ears, a hawk-like beak and a conspicuous circle of feathers around each eye called a facial disk.

- Rodrigues scops owl, Otus murivorus (X)
- Mauritius scops owl, Otus sauzieri (X)

== Rollers ==
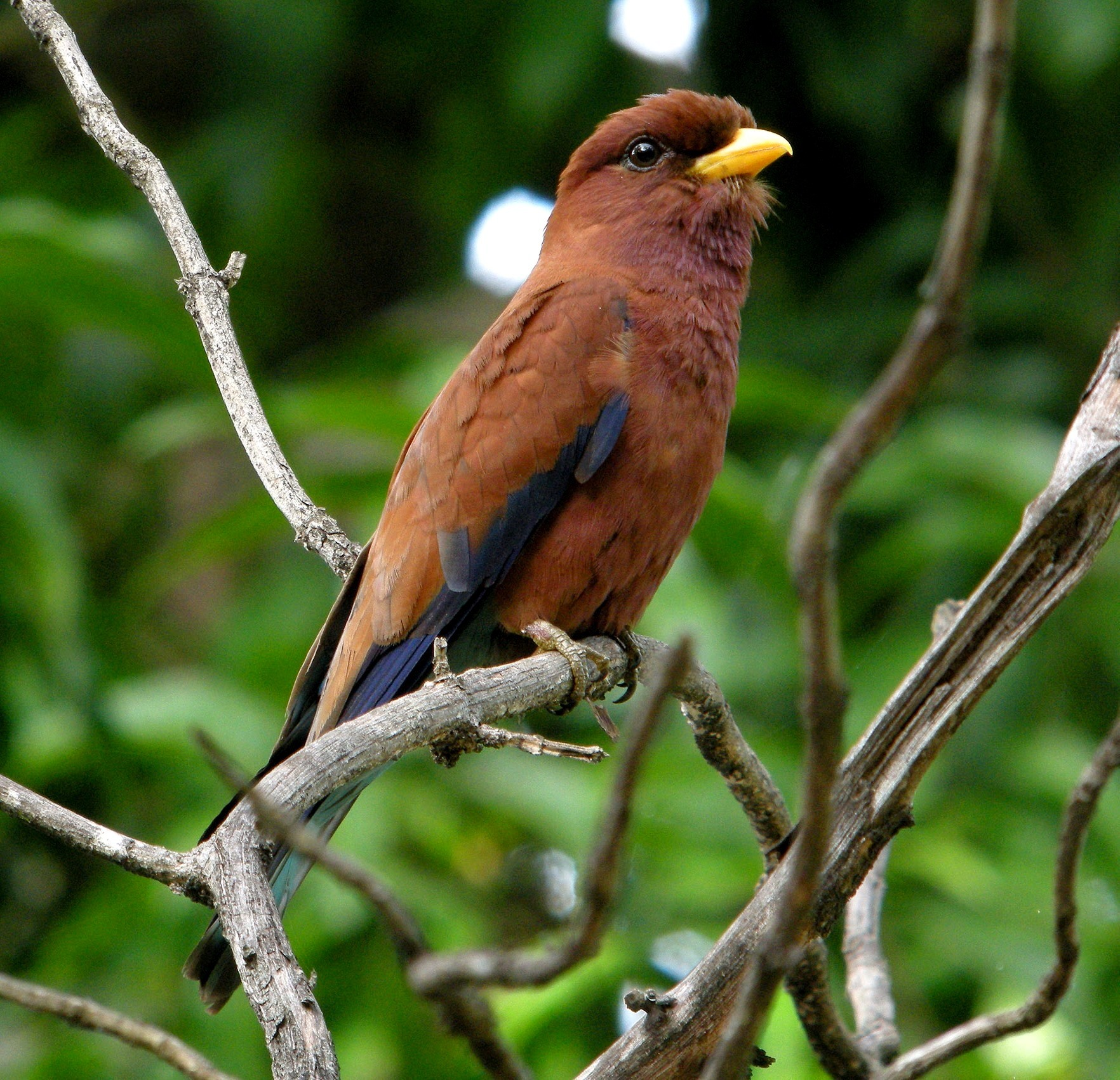
Broad-billed roller

Order: Coraciiformes Family: Coraciidae

Rollers resemble crows in size and build, but are more closely related to the kingfishers and bee-eaters. They share the colourful appearance of those groups with blues and browns predominating. The two inner front toes are connected, but the outer toe is not.

- Broad-billed roller, Eurystomus glaucurus (A)

== Falcons and caracaras ==
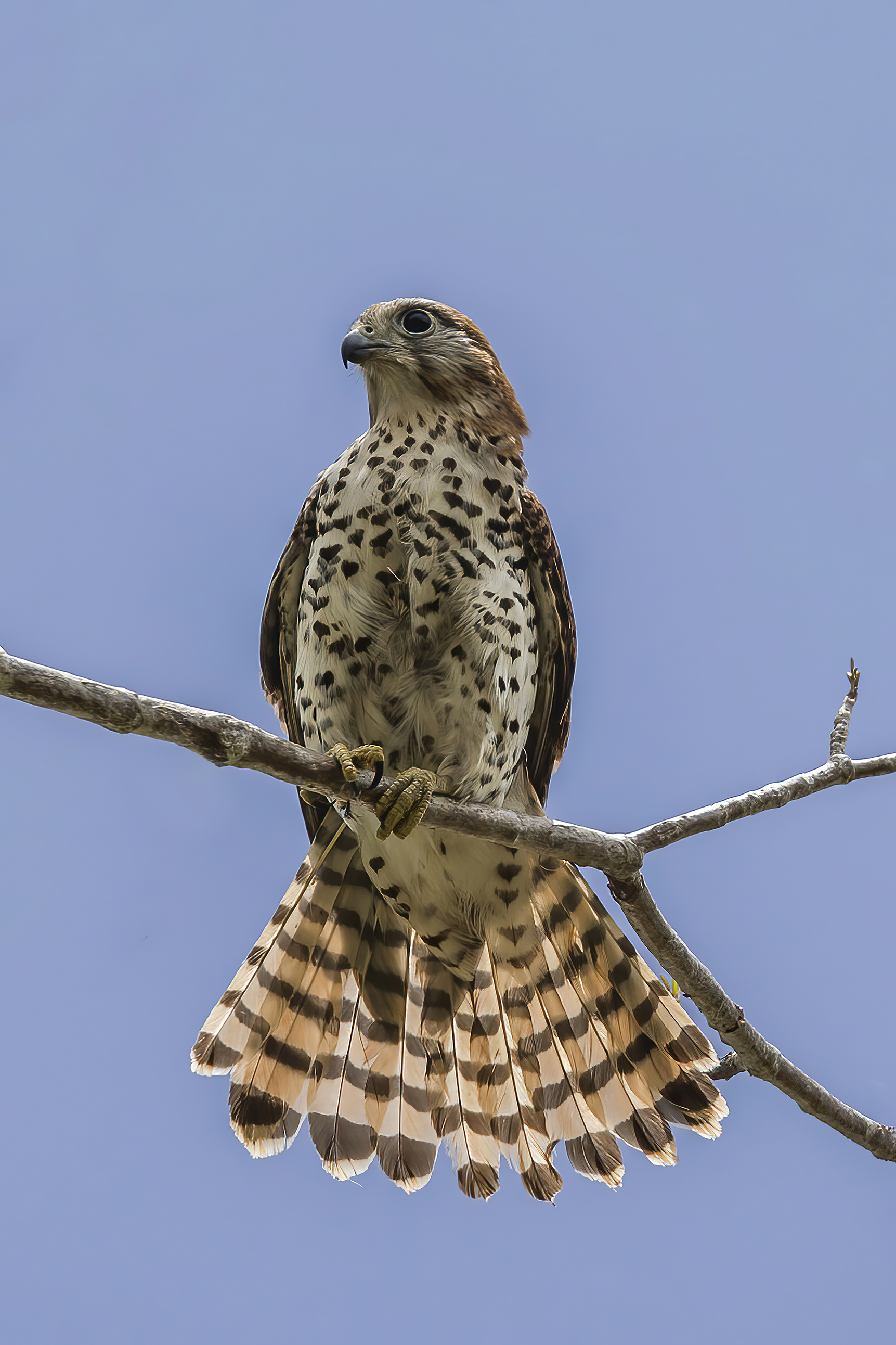
Mauritius kestrel

Order: Falconiformes Family: Falconidae

Falconidae is a family of diurnal birds of prey. They differ from hawks, eagles and kites in that they kill with their beaks instead of their talons.

- Lesser kestrel, Falco naumanni (A)
- Mauritius kestrel, Falco punctatus (E)
- Eleonora's falcon, Falco eleonorae (A)
- Sooty falcon, Falco concolor (A)
- Peregrine falcon, Falco peregrinus (A)

== Old World parrots ==
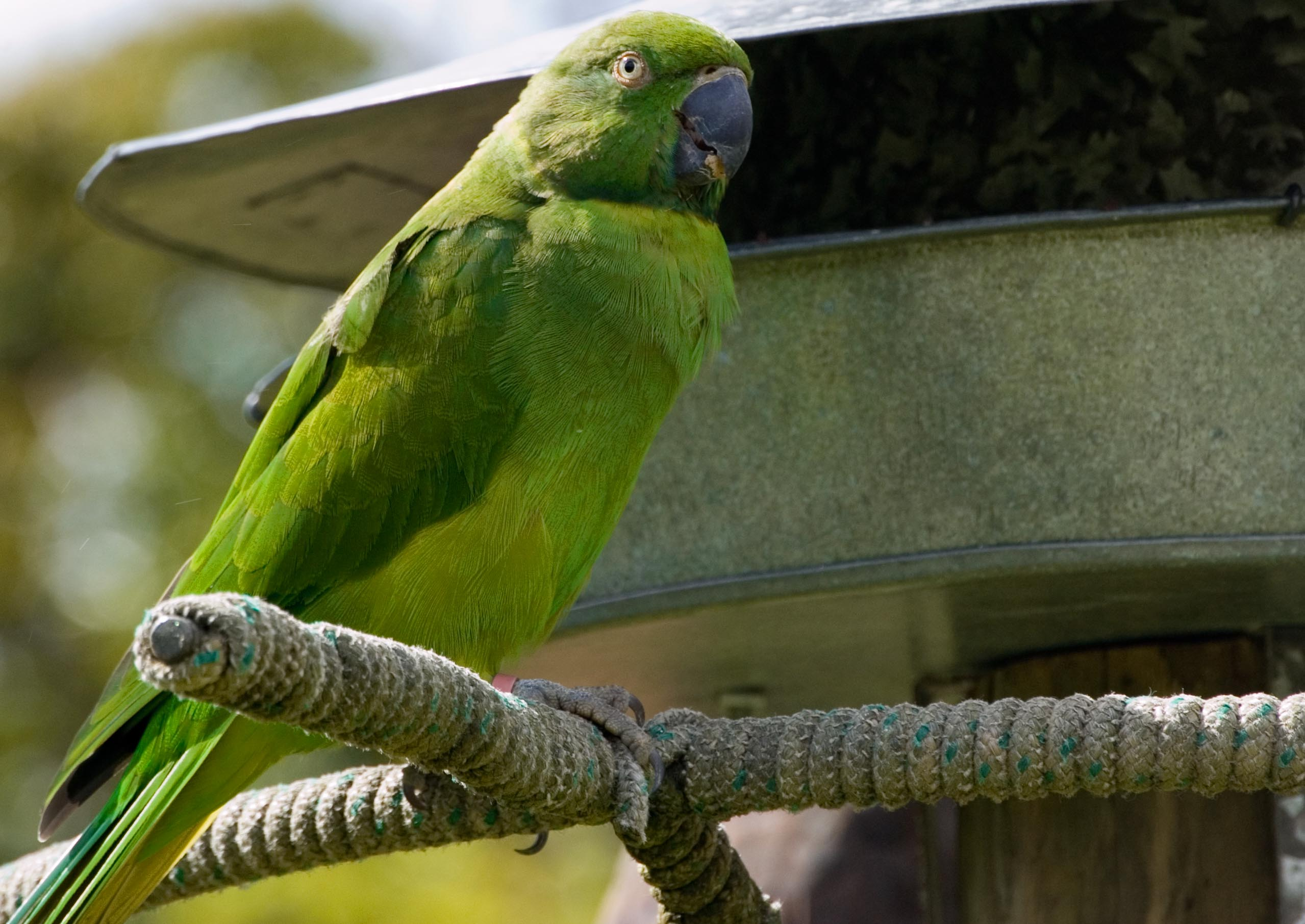
Mauritius parakeet

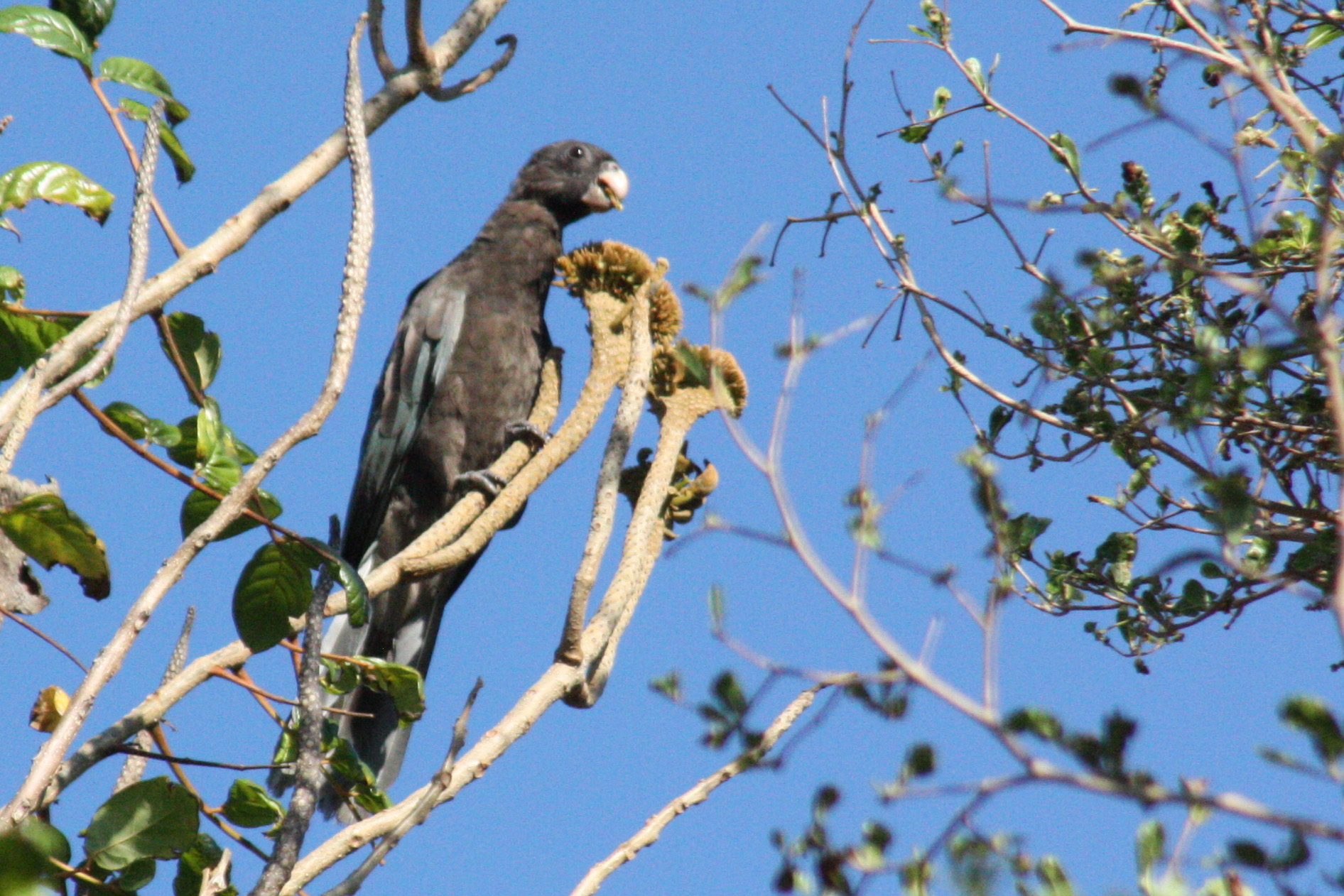
Lesser vasa parrot

Order: Psittaciformes Family: Psittaculidae

Characteristic features of parrots include a strong curved bill, an upright stance, strong legs, and clawed zygodactyl feet. Many parrots are vividly coloured, and some are multi-coloured. In size they range from 8 cm (3.1 in) to 1 m (3.3 ft) in length. Old World parrots are found from Africa east across south and southeast Asia and Oceania to Australia and New Zealand.

- Lesser vasa parrot, Coracopsis nigra (I)
- Rose-ringed parakeet, Psittacula krameri (I)
- Echo parakeet, Psittacula eques (E)
- Newton's parakeet, Psittacula exsul (X)
- Mascarene grey parakeet, Psittacula bensoni (X)
- Broad-billed parrot, Lophopsittacus mauritianus (X)
- Rodrigues parrot, Necropsittacus rodricanus (X)
- Grey-headed lovebird, Agapornis canus (Ex)
- Mascarene parrot, Mascarinus mascarin (X)

== Cuckooshrikes ==
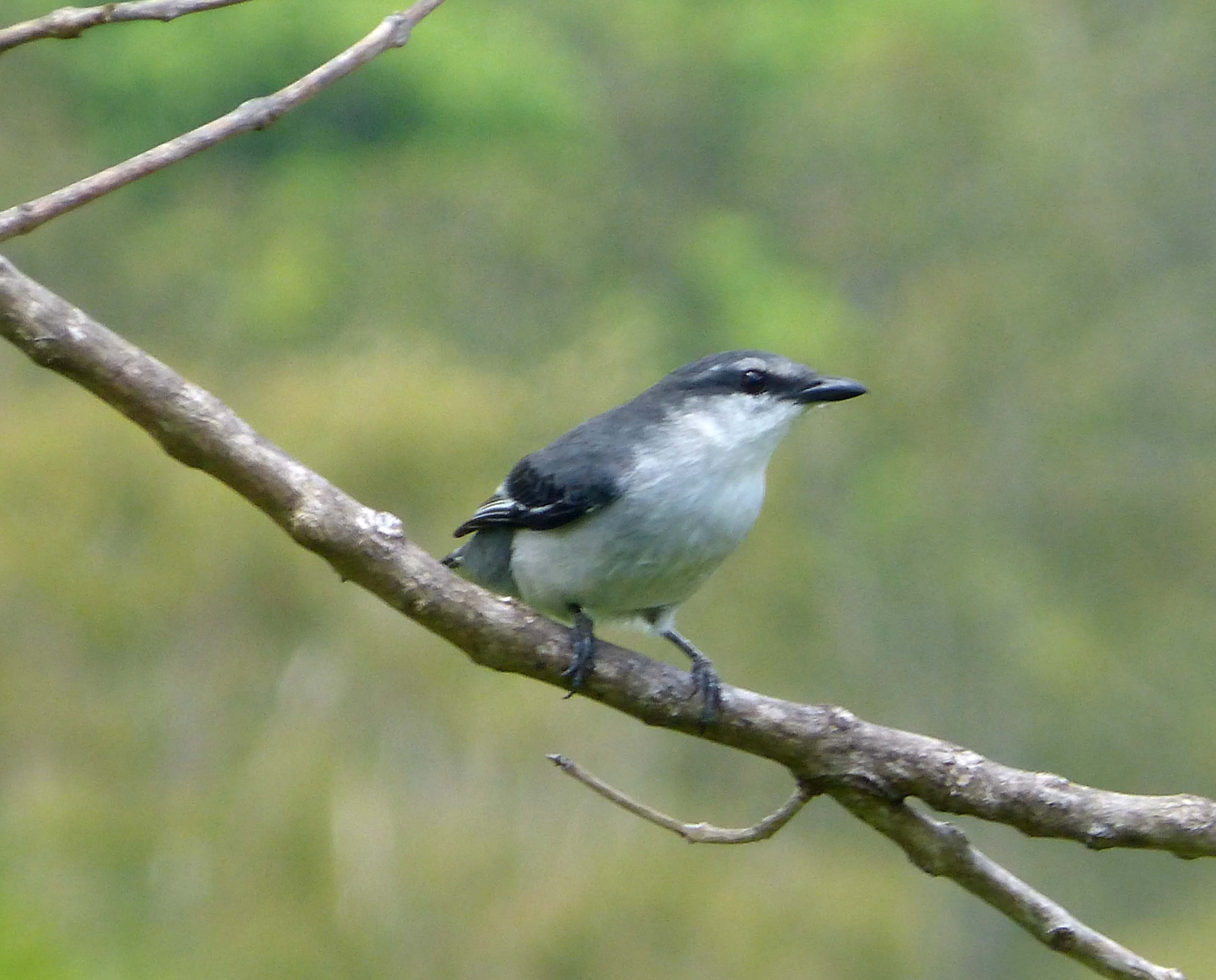
Mauritius cuckooshrike

Order: Passeriformes Family: Campephagidae

The cuckooshrikes are small to medium-sized passerine birds. They are predominantly greyish with white and black, although some species are brightly coloured.

- Mauritius cuckooshrike, Lalage typica (E)

== Monarch flycatchers ==
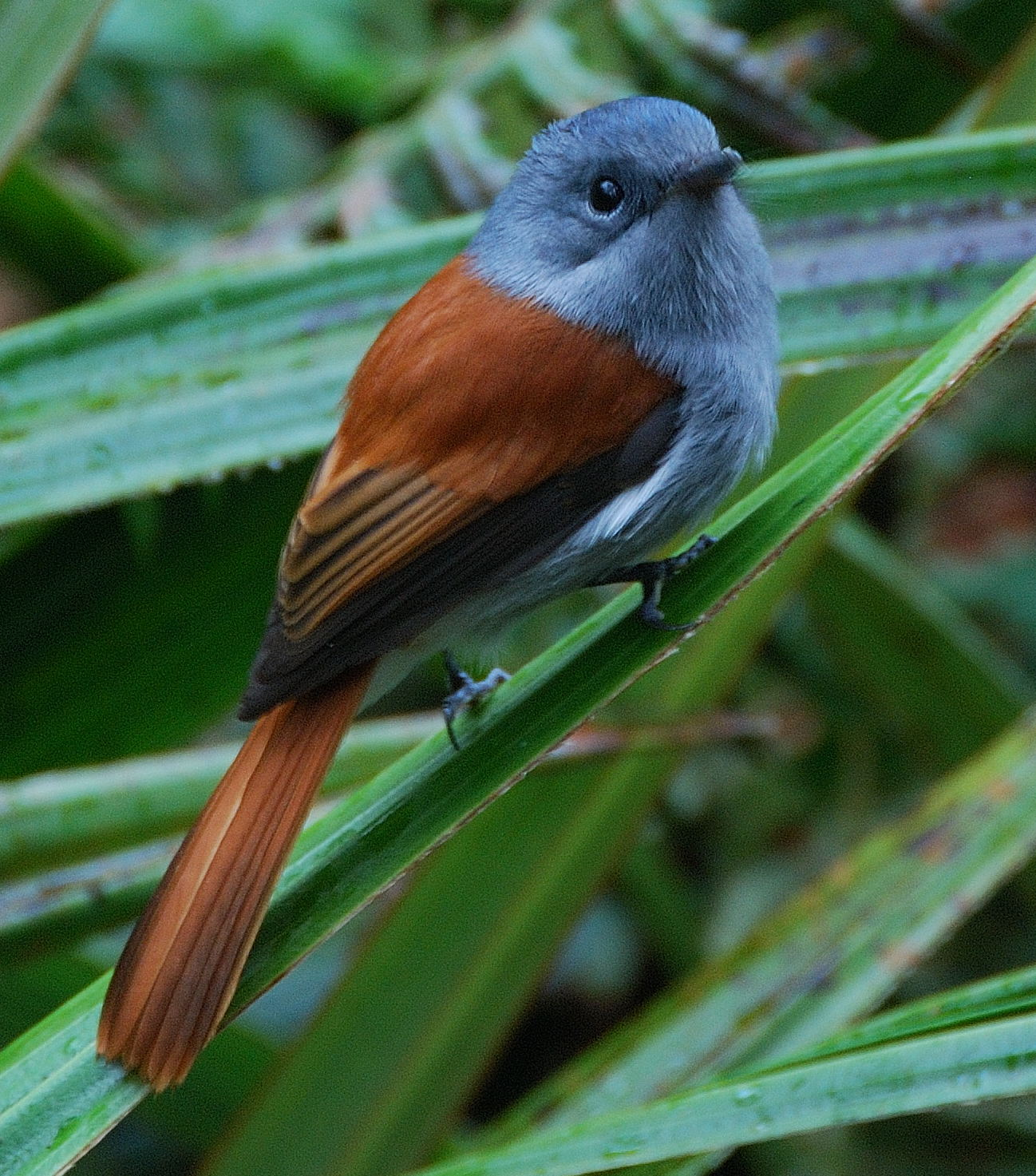
Mascarene paradise flycatcher

Order: Passeriformes Family: Monarchidae

The monarch flycatchers are small to medium-sized insectivorous passerines which hunt by flycatching.

- Mascarene paradise flycatcher, Terpsiphone bourbonnensis
  - Mauritius paradise flycatcher, Terpsiphone bourbonnensis desolata (E)

== Crows, jays, and magpies ==
Order: Passeriformes Family: Corvidae

The family Corvidae includes crows, ravens, jays, choughs, magpies, treepies, nutcrackers and ground jays. Corvids are above average in size among the Passeriformes, and some of the larger species show high levels of intelligence.

- House crow, Corvus splendens (I)

== Reed warblers and allies ==
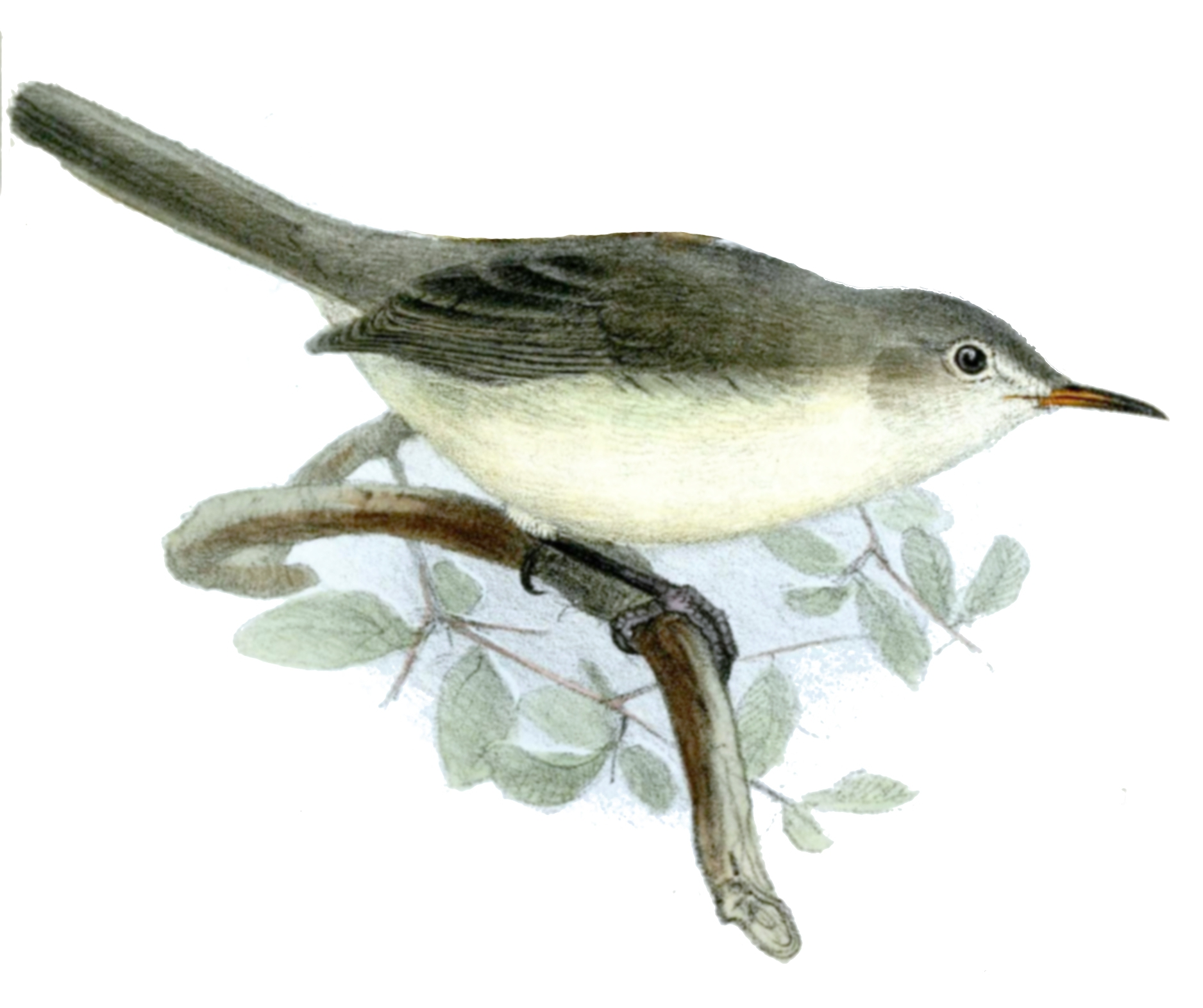
Rodrigues warbler

Order: Passeriformes Family: Acrocephalidae

The members of this family are usually rather large for "warblers". Most are rather plain olivaceous brown above with much yellow to beige below. They are usually found in open woodland, reedbeds, or tall grass. The family occurs mostly in southern to western Eurasia and surroundings, but it also ranges far into the Pacific, with some species in Africa.

- Rodrigues warbler, Acrocephalus rodericanus (E)

== Swallows ==
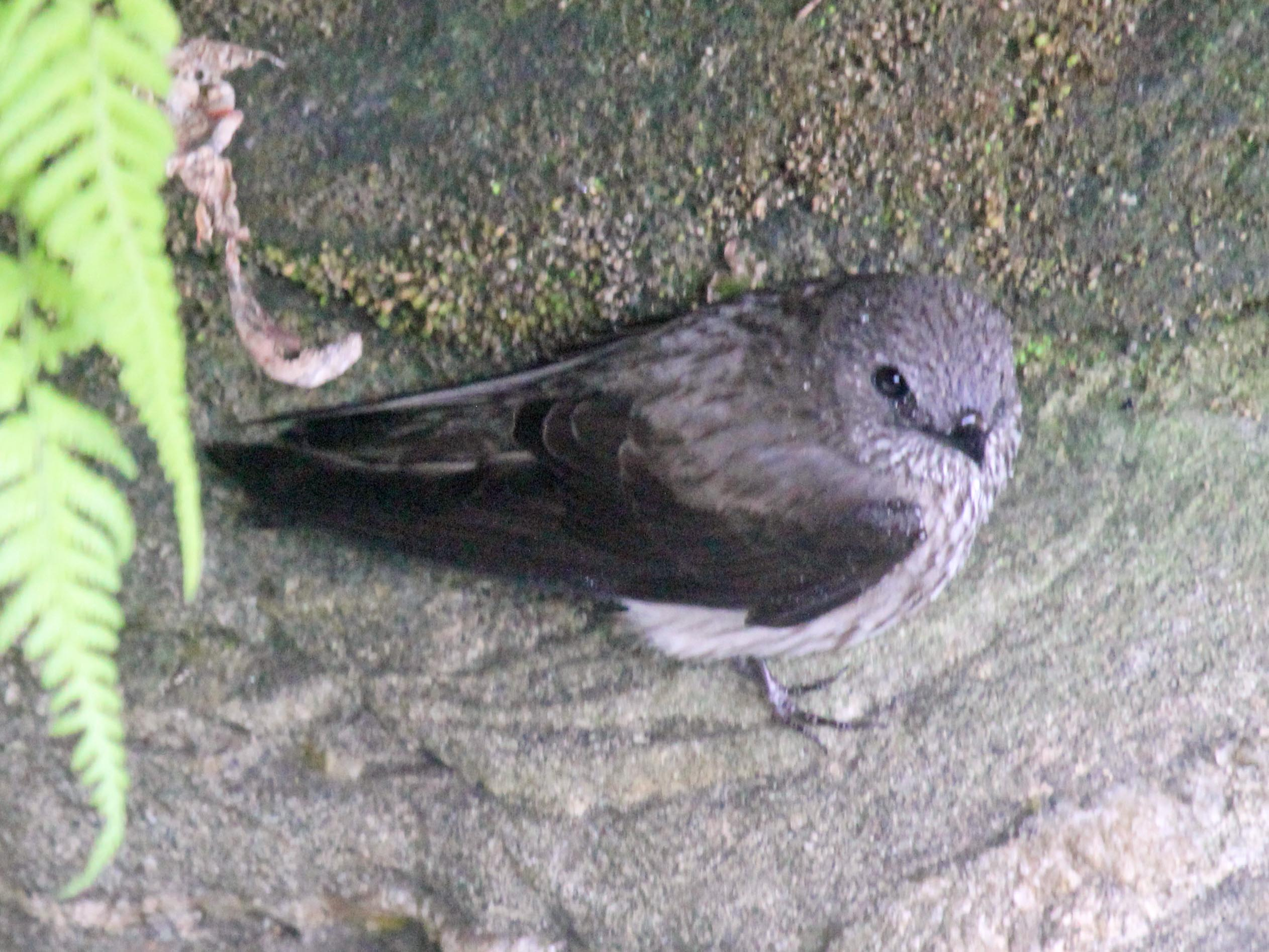
Mascarene martin

Order: Passeriformes Family: Hirundinidae

The family Hirundinidae is adapted to aerial feeding. They have a slender streamlined body, long pointed wings and a short bill with a wide gape. The feet are adapted to perching rather than walking, and the front toes are partially joined at the base.

- Mascarene martin, Phedina borbonica

== Bulbuls ==
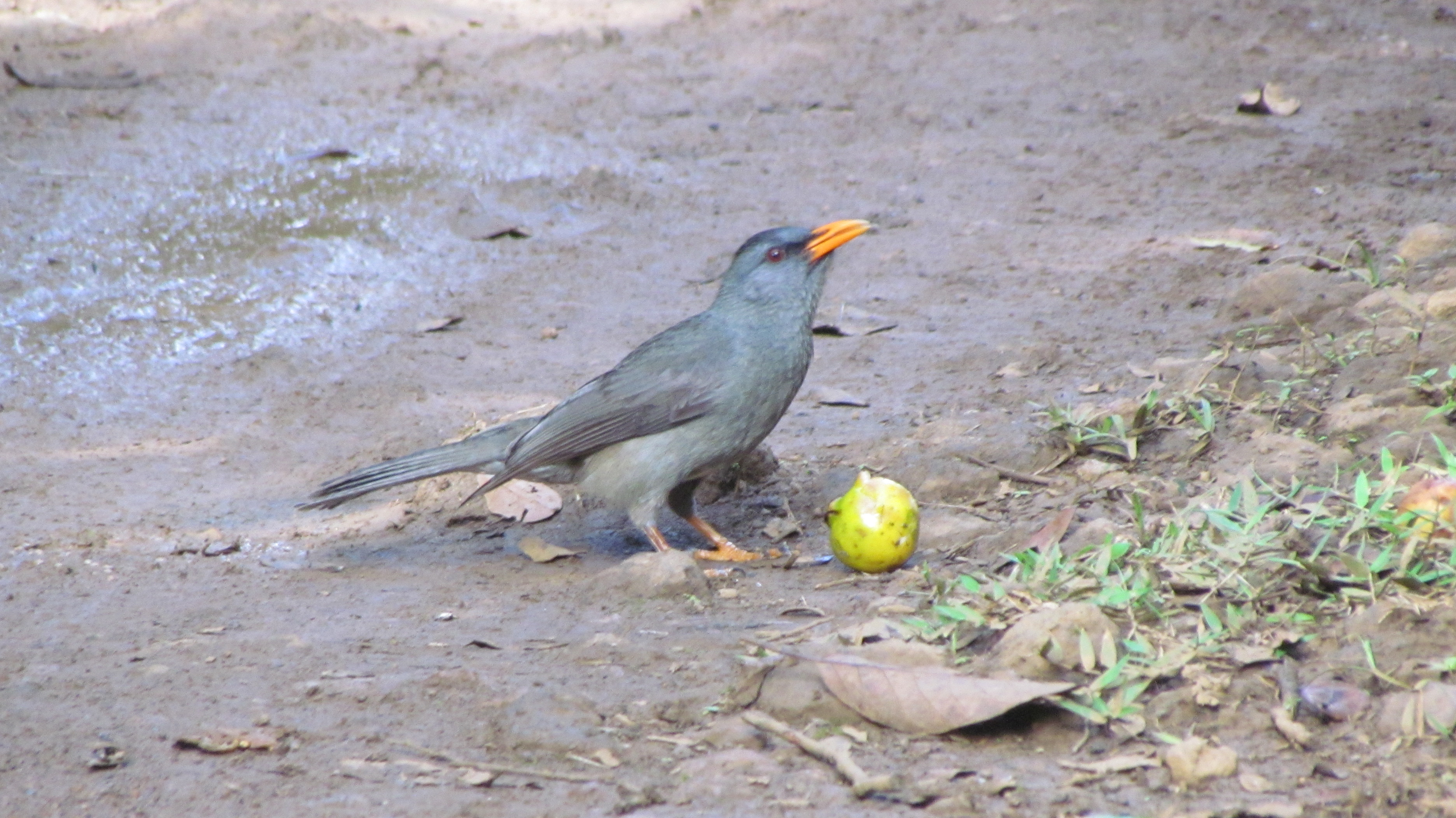
Mauritius bulbul

Order: Passeriformes Family: Pycnonotidae

Bulbuls are medium-sized songbirds. Some are colourful with yellow, red or orange vents, cheeks, throats or supercilia, but most are drab, with uniform olive-brown to black plumage. Some species have distinct crests.

- Red-whiskered bulbul, Pycnonotus jocosus (I)
- Mauritius bulbul, Hypsipetes olivaceus (E)
- Rodrigues bulbul, Hypsipetes cowlesi (X)

== White-eyes, yuhinas, and allies ==
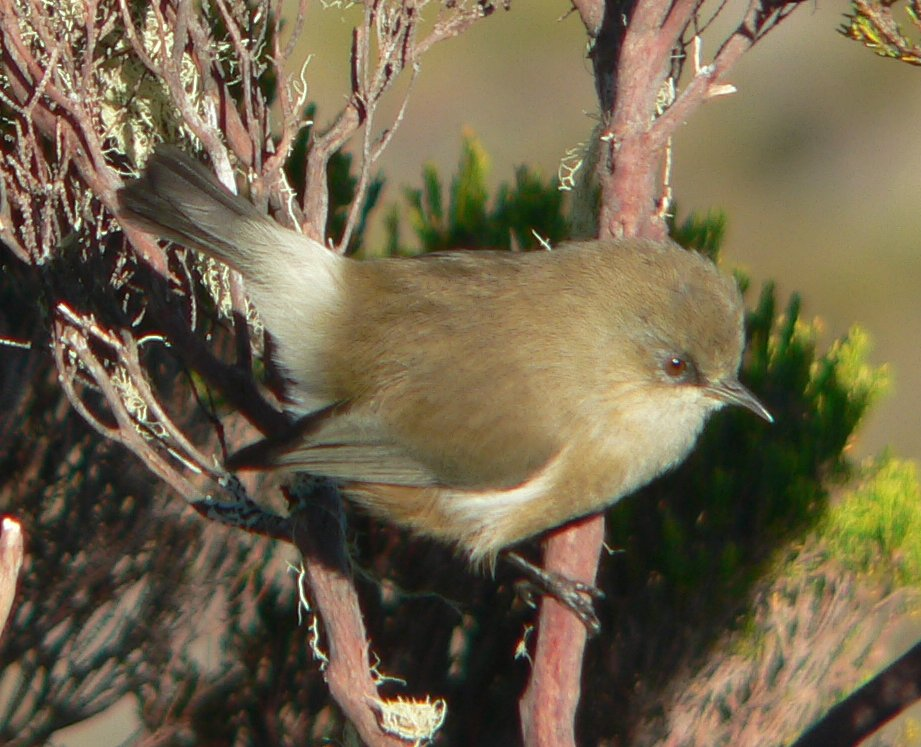
Mauritius white-eye

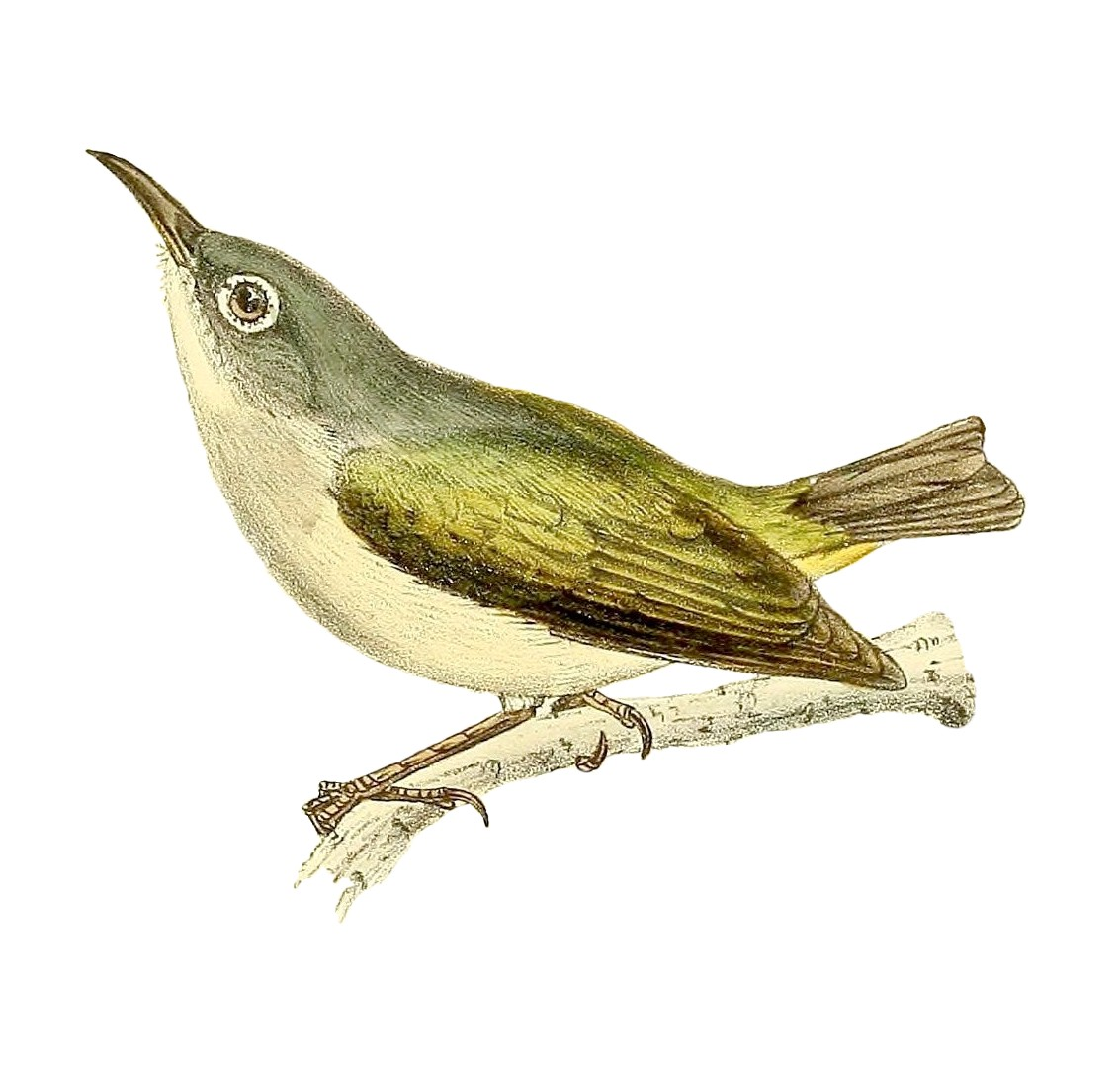
Mauritius olive white-eye

Order: Passeriformes Family: Zosteropidae

The white-eyes are small and mostly undistinguished, their plumage above being generally some dull colour like greenish-olive, but some species have a white or bright yellow throat, breast or lower parts, and several have buff flanks. As their name suggests, many species have a white ring around each eye.

- Mauritius olive white-eye, Zosterops chloronothos (E)
- Mauritius grey white-eye, Zosterops mauritianus (E)

== Starlings ==
Order: Passeriformes Family: Sturnidae

Starlings are small to medium-sized passerine birds. Their flight is strong and direct and they are very gregarious. Their preferred habitat is fairly open country. They eat insects and fruit. Plumage is typically dark with a metallic sheen.

- Mauritius starling, Cryptopsar ischyrhynchus (X)
- Rodrigues starling, Necropsar rodericanus (X)
- Common myna, Acridotheres tristis (I)

== Thrushes and allies ==
Order: Passeriformes Family: Turdidae

The family Turdidae includes the true thrushes, a group of passerine birds found worldwide. Most species are insectivorous or omnivorous, feeding on the ground or in low vegetation, and many have melodious songs.

- Mauritius ground thrush, Geokichla longitarsus (X)

== Weavers and allies ==
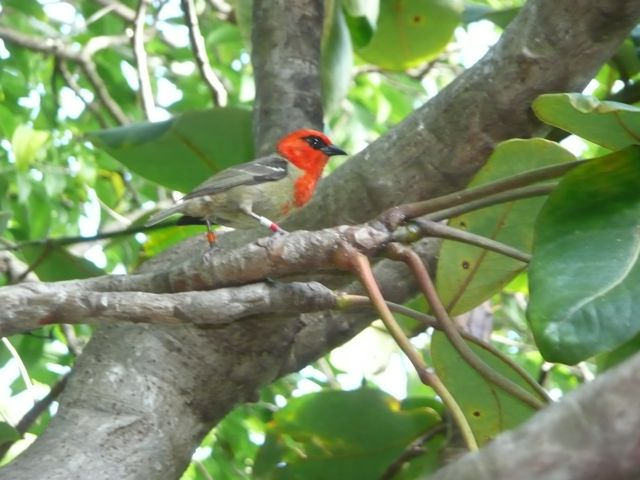
Mauritius fody

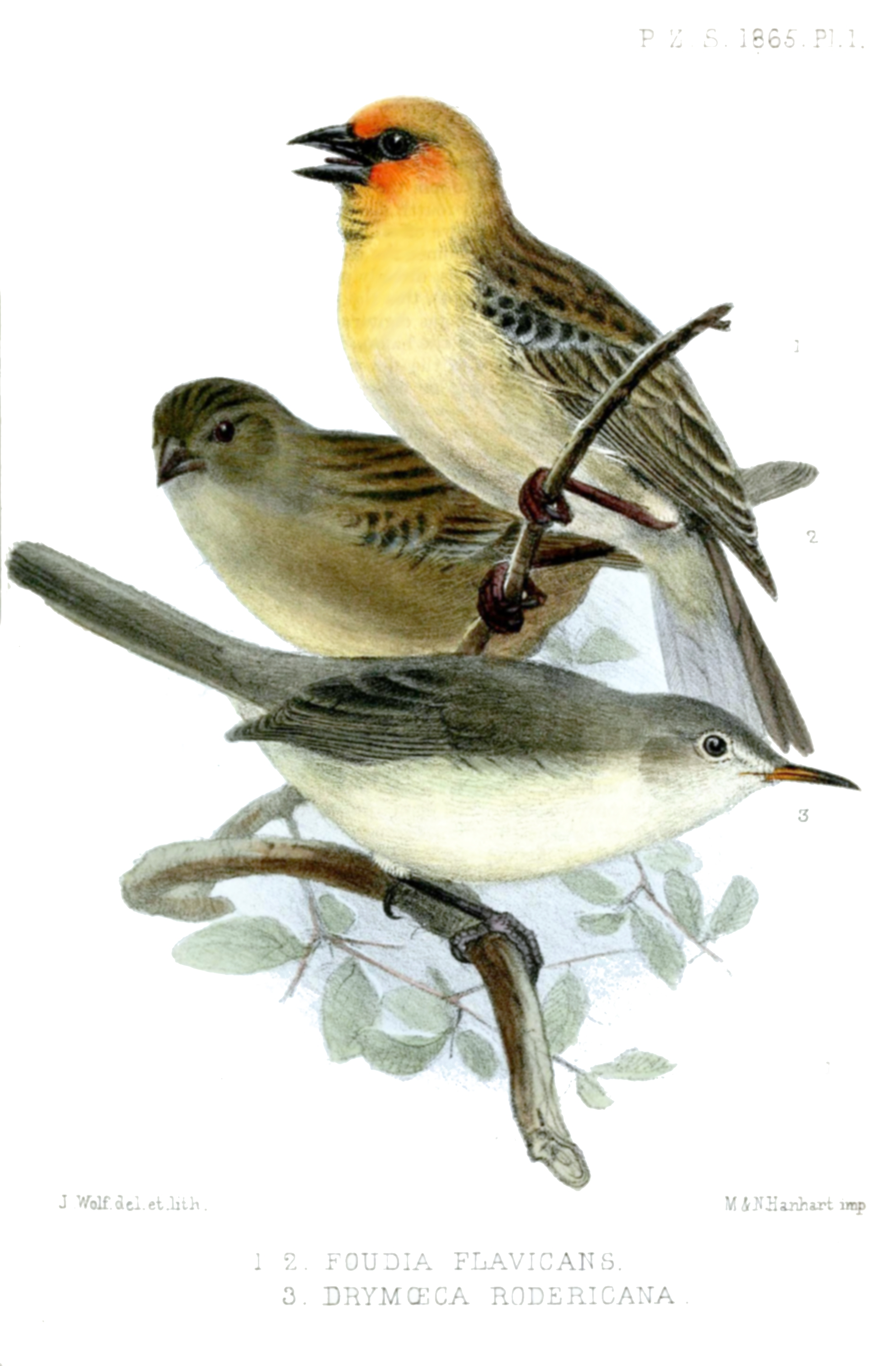
Rodrigues fody

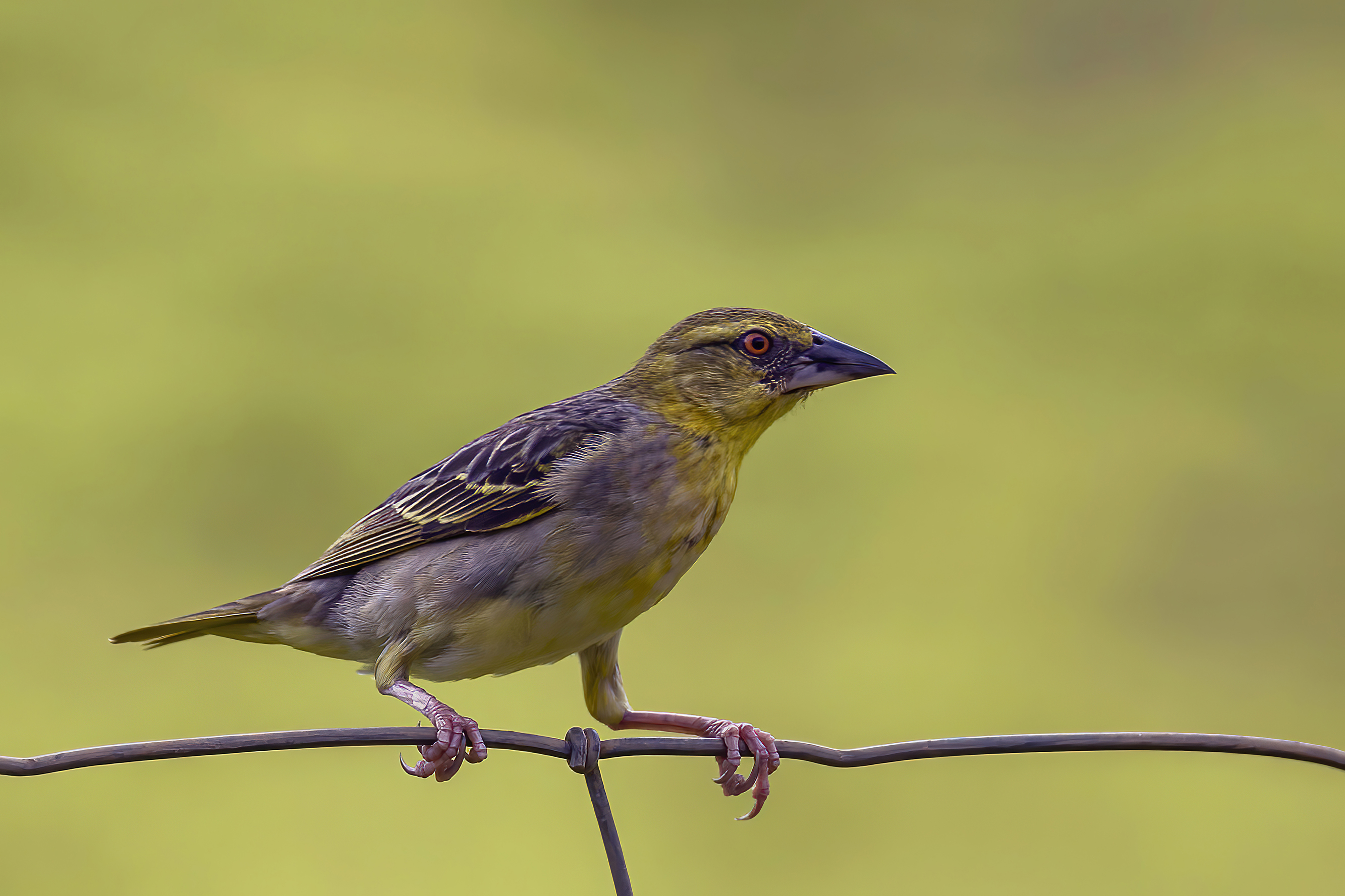
Female village weaver in Mauritius

Order: Passeriformes Family: Ploceidae

The weavers are small passerine birds related to the finches. They are seed-eating birds with rounded conical bills. The males of many species are brightly coloured, usually in red or yellow and black, some species show variation in colour only in the breeding season.

- Village weaver, Ploceus cucullatus (I)
- Red fody, Foudia madagascariensis (I)
- Mauritius fody, Foudia rubra (E)
- Rodrigues fody, Foudia flavicans (E)

== Waxbills and allies ==
Order: Passeriformes Family: Estrildidae

The estrildid finches are small passerine birds of the Old World tropics and Australasia. They are gregarious and often colonial seed eaters with short thick but pointed bills. They are all similar in structure and habits, but have wide variation in plumage colours and patterns.

- Scaly-breasted munia, Lonchura punctulata (I)
- Common waxbill, Estrilda astrild (I)
- Red avadavat, Amandava amandava (Ex)
- Java sparrow, Padda oryzivora (I)

== Old World sparrows ==
Order: Passeriformes Family: Passeridae

Old World sparrows are small passerine birds. In general, sparrows tend to be small, plump, brown or grey birds with short tails and short powerful beaks. Sparrows are seed eaters, but they also consume small insects.

- House sparrow, Passer domesticus (I)

== Finches, euphonias, and allies ==
Order: Passeriformes Family: Fringillidae

Finches are seed-eating passerine birds, that are small to moderately large and have a strong beak, usually conical and in some species very large. All have twelve tail feathers and nine primaries. These birds have a bouncing flight with alternating bouts of flapping and gliding on closed wings, and most sing well.

- Yellow-fronted canary, Crithagra mozambica (I)
- Cape Canary, Serinus canicollis (I)

== See also ==
- List of birds
- Lists of birds by region
- Wildlife of Mauritius
- List of birds of Réunion
