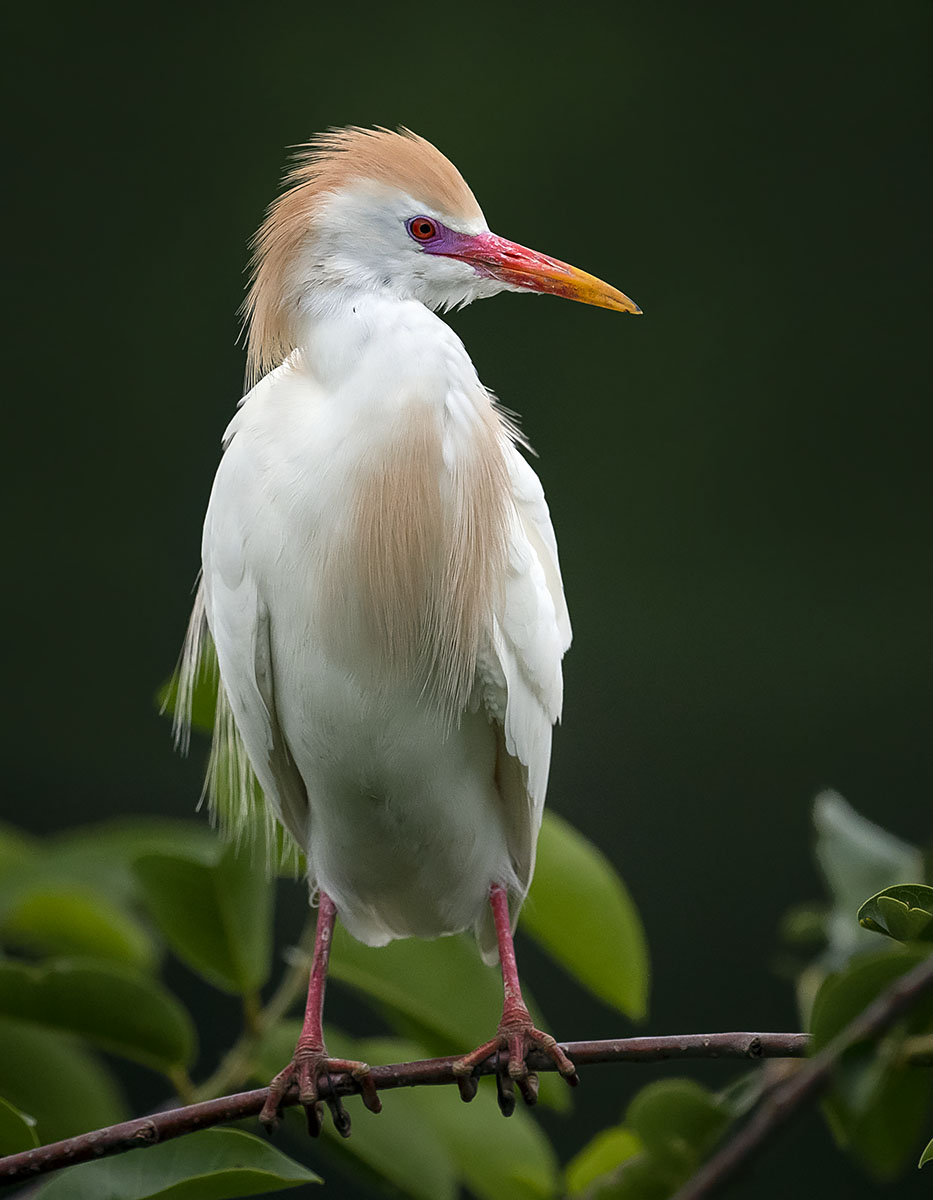
- Breeding-plumaged western cattle egret (Ardea ibis) in Wakodahatchee Wetlands, Florida
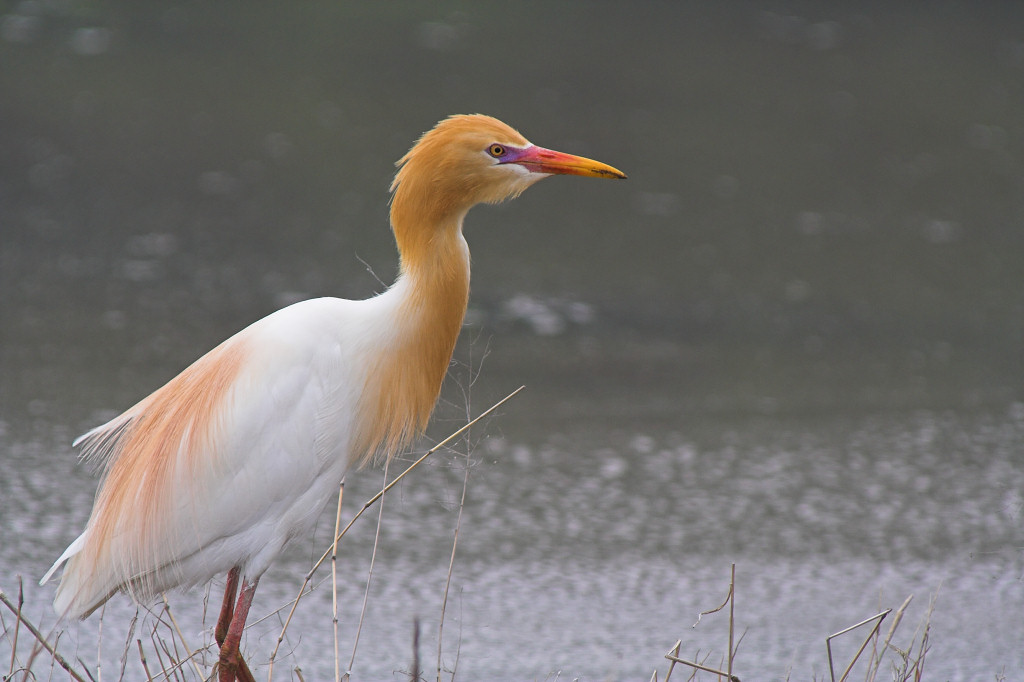
- Breeding-plumaged eastern cattle egret (Ardea coromanda) in Japan showing the red flush on the legs and bill, present at the height of the breeding season

Conservation status
- Least Concern (IUCN 3.1)

Scientific classification
- Kingdom: Animalia
- Phylum: Chordata
- Class: Aves
- Order: Pelecaniformes
- Family: Ardeidae
- Subfamily: Ardeinae
- Genus: Ardea

Species
- A. ibis (Linnaeus, 1758); A. coromanda (Boddaert, 1783)
- Range of cattle egrets breeding non-breeding year-round

= Cattle egret =

Former genus of herons

The cattle egrets (formerly genus Bubulcus) are a cosmopolitan clade of herons (family Ardeidae) in the genus Ardea found in the tropics, subtropics, warm temperate, and increasingly in cooler temperate zones. As currently treated, the clade contains two species, the western cattle egret and the eastern cattle egret, although some authorities (particularly in the past) regarded them as a single species. Despite the similarities in plumage to the egrets of the genus Egretta, they have recently been found to be genetically embedded within the genus Ardea, and are now included there. Originally native to parts of Asia, Africa, and southernmost Europe, the two species have undergone rapid expansion in their distribution and have successfully colonised much of the rest of the world in the last century.

They are white birds adorned with buff plumes in the breeding season. They nest in colonies, usually near bodies of water and often with other wading birds. The nest is a platform of sticks in trees or shrubs. Cattle egrets exploit drier and open habitats more than other heron species. Their feeding habitats include seasonally inundated grasslands, pastures, farmlands, wetlands, and rice paddies. They often accompany cattle or other large mammals, catching insect and small vertebrate prey disturbed by these animals. Some populations are migratory and others show postbreeding dispersal.

Adult cattle egrets have few predators, but birds or mammals may raid their nests, and chicks may be lost to starvation, calcium deficiency, or disturbance from other large birds. Cattle egrets maintain a special relationship with cattle, which extends to other large grazing mammals; increased human livestock farming is believed to be a major cause of their suddenly expanded range. Cattle egrets remove ticks and flies from cattle and consume them. This benefits both organisms, but it has been implicated in the spread of tick-borne animal diseases.

== Taxonomy ==
Before the description of the Bubulcus by Charles Lucien Bonaparte in 1855, the western cattle egret had already been described in 1758 by Carl Linnaeus in his Systema Naturae as Ardea ibis, while the eastern cattle egret was described in 1783 by Pieter Boddaert as Cancroma coromanda. Their former generic name Bubulcus is Latin for herdsman, referring, like the English name, to their association with cattle. The species name ibis is a Latin and Greek word which originally referred to another white wetland bird, the sacred ibis, but was applied to the western cattle egret in error. The epithet coromanda refers to the Coromandel Coast of India.

The eastern and western cattle egrets were first split by McAllan and Bruce in 1988, but were regarded as conspecific by almost all other recent authors until the publication of the influential Birds of South Asia. The eastern cattle egret breeds in southern and eastern Asia and Australasia, and the western species occupies the rest of the cattle egret's range, including southwestern Asia, Europe, Africa, and the Americas. According to the IOC birdlist, they are both monotypic species. Some authorities have recognised a third taxon in the Seychelles, A. i. seychellarum, which was first described by Finn Salomonsen in 1934, but this is now considered synonymous with typical A. ibis.

Despite superficial similarities in appearance, the cattle egret is more closely related to the other members of the genus Ardea, which comprises the great or typical herons and the great egret (A. alba), than to the majority of species termed egrets in the genus Egretta. Rare cases of hybridisation with little blue herons (Egretta caerulea), little egrets (E. garzetta), and snowy egrets (E. thula) have been recorded.

An older English name for cattle egrets is buff-backed heron.

== Description ==
The cattle egrets are stocky herons with a wingspan of 88–96 cm (34 1/2–38 in); they are 46–56 cm (18–22 in) long, and weigh 270–512 g (9 1/2–18 oz). They have a relatively short, thick neck, a sturdy bill, and a hunched posture. The nonbreeding adults have mainly white plumage, a yellow bill, and greyish-yellow legs. During the breeding season, adults of the western cattle egret develop orange-buff plumes on the back, breast, and crown, and the bill, legs, and irises become bright red for a brief period prior to pairing. The sexes are similar, but the male is marginally larger and has slightly longer breeding plumes than the female. Juvenile birds lack coloured plumes and some have a black bill briefly after fledging. Birds in the Seychelles, argued by some to be a valid subspecies A. i. seychellarum, were first reported to be smaller and shorter-winged than the other forms, but are not outside the range of variation found elsewhere in western cattle egret, particularly in eastern Africa. They also have white cheeks and throat, like A. ibis; the nuptial plumes, first reported to be golden as in A. coromanda, are also within the range of variation in typical A. ibis, and less extensive than in A. coromanda.

The eastern cattle egret differs from the western in breeding plumage, when the buff colour on its head extends to the cheeks and throat, and the plumes are more golden in colour. Its bill and tarsi are longer on average than in A. ibis, though with some overlap.

Individuals with abnormally grey, melanistic plumages have been recorded.

The positioning of their eyes allows for binocular vision during feeding, and physiological studies suggest that they may be capable of crepuscular or nocturnal activity. Adapted to foraging on land, they have lost the ability possessed by their wetland relatives to accurately correct for light refraction by water.

== Distribution and habitat ==
Range expansion in the Americas

The western cattle egret has undergone one of the most rapid and wide-reaching natural expansions of any bird species. It was originally native to parts of southern Spain and Portugal, tropical and subtropical Africa, and humid tropical and subtropical Asia. At the end of the 19th century, it began expanding its range into southern Africa, first breeding in the Cape Province in 1908. Cattle egrets were first sighted in the Americas on the boundary of Guiana and Suriname in 1877, having apparently flown across the Atlantic Ocean. In the 1930s, the species is thought to have become established in that area. It is now widely distributed across Brazil and was first discovered in the northern region of the country in 1964, feeding along with buffalos.

The western cattle egret first arrived in North America in 1941 (these early sightings were originally dismissed as escapees), bred in Florida in 1953, and spread rapidly, breeding for the first time in Canada in 1962. It is now commonly seen as far west as California. It was first recorded breeding in Cuba in 1957, in Costa Rica in 1958, and in Mexico in 1963, although it was probably established before then. In Europe, the species had historically declined in Spain and Portugal, but in the latter part of the 20th century, it expanded back through the Iberian Peninsula, and then began to colonise other parts of Europe, southern France in 1958, northern France in 1981, and Italy in 1985. Breeding in the United Kingdom was recorded for the first time in 2008, only a year after an influx seen in the previous year. In 2008, western cattle egrets were also reported as having moved into Ireland for the first time. This trend has continued and western cattle egrets have become more numerous in southern Britain with influxes in some numbers during the nonbreeding seasons of 2007/08 and 2016/17. They bred in Britain again in 2017, following an influx in the previous winter, and may become established there.

The eastern cattle egret has also expanded its range markedly. In Australia, the colonisation began in the 1940s, when they established in the north and east of the continent. It began to regularly visit New Zealand in the 1960s; the species now breeds throughout both countries, except for the drier parts of Australia.

The massive and rapid expansion of the two cattle egret ranges is due to their relationship with humans and their domesticated animals. Originally adapted to a commensal relationship with large grazing and browsing animals, it was easily able to switch to domesticated cattle and horses. As the keeping of livestock spread throughout the world, the cattle egret was able to occupy otherwise empty niches. Many populations of cattle egrets are migratory and dispersive, and this has helped the genus' range expansion. Cattle egrets have been seen as vagrants in various sub-Antarctic islands, including South Georgia, Marion Island, the South Sandwich Islands, and the South Orkney Islands. A small flock of eight birds was also seen in Fiji in 2008.

In addition to the natural expansion of its range, cattle egrets have been deliberately introduced into a few areas. The western cattle egret was introduced to Hawaii in 1959, and to the Chagos Archipelago in 1955. Successful releases were also made in the Seychelles and Rodrigues, but attempts to introduce them to Mauritius failed. Numerous birds were also released by Whipsnade Zoo in England, but they never became established.

Although cattle egrets sometimes feed in shallow water, unlike most herons, they are typically found in fields and dry grassy habitats, reflecting its greater dietary reliance on terrestrial insects rather than aquatic prey.

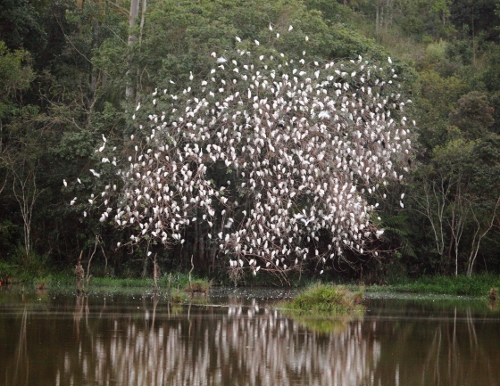
A large flock of western cattle egrets in a tree at Jacutinga, Minas Gerais, Brazil

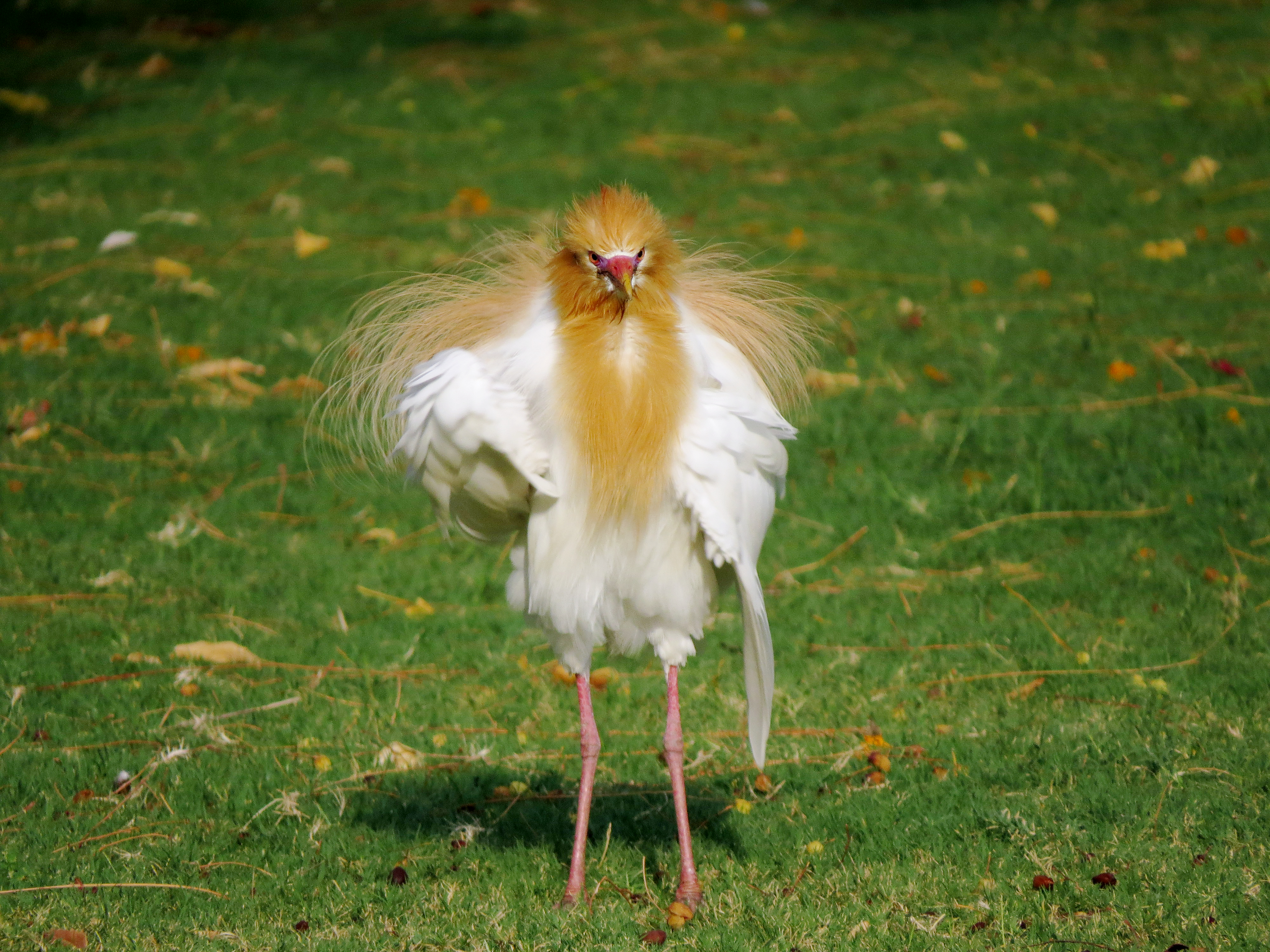
Eastern cattle egret in India, with the orange plumes raised

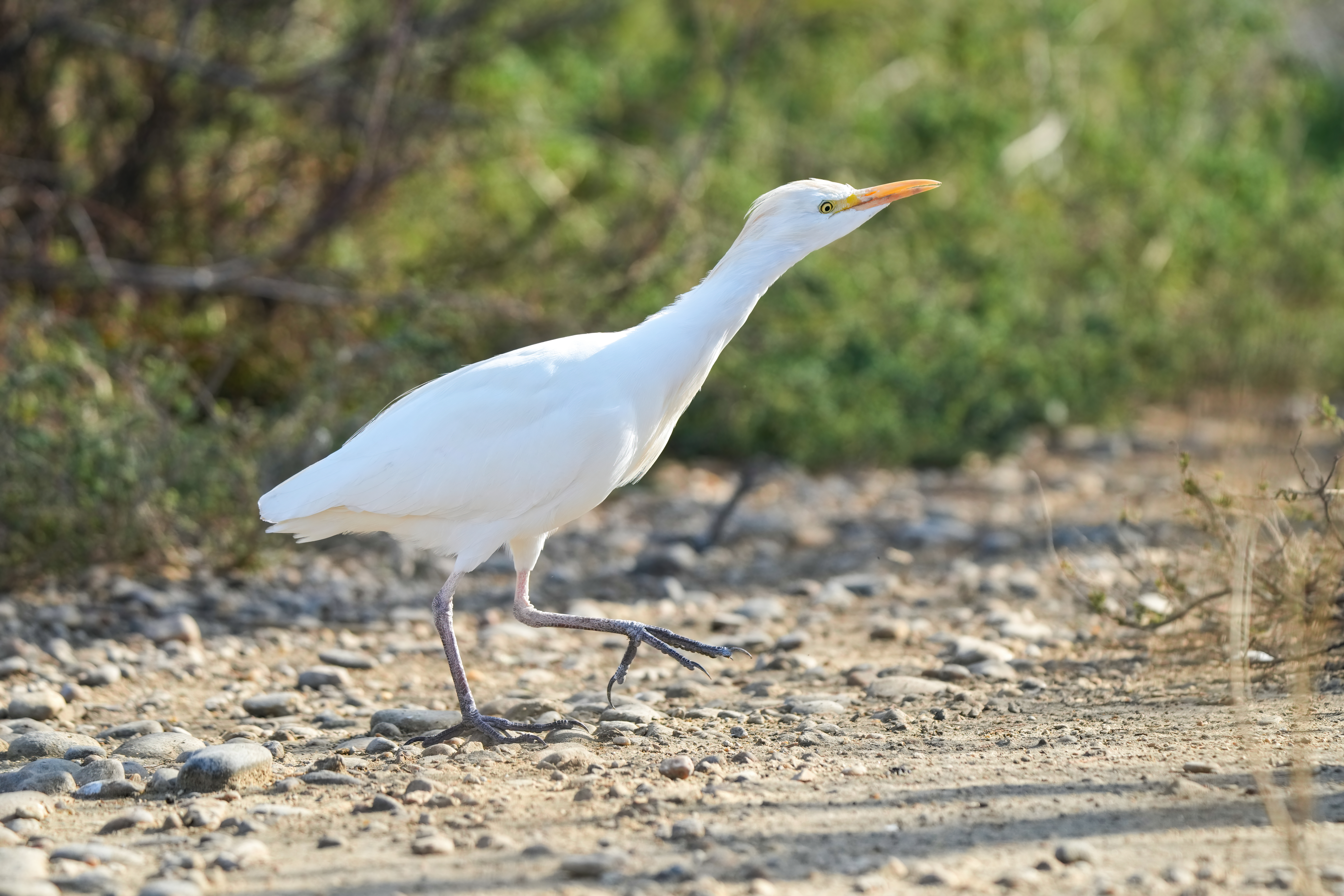
Western cattle egret in southern France, in winter plumage; the two species are not readily distinguishable in this plumage.

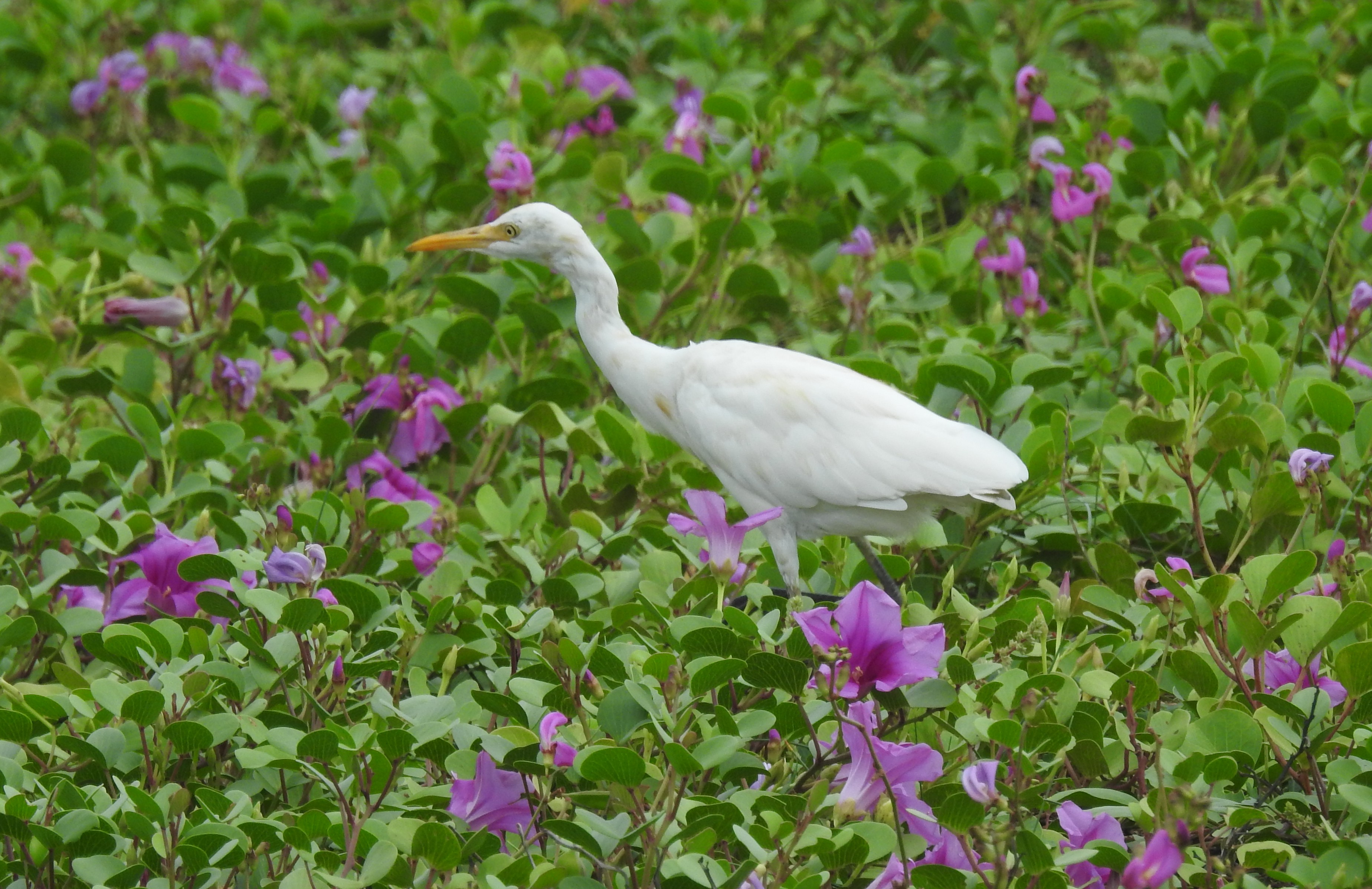
Eastern cattle egret in Chennai, India, in winter plumage

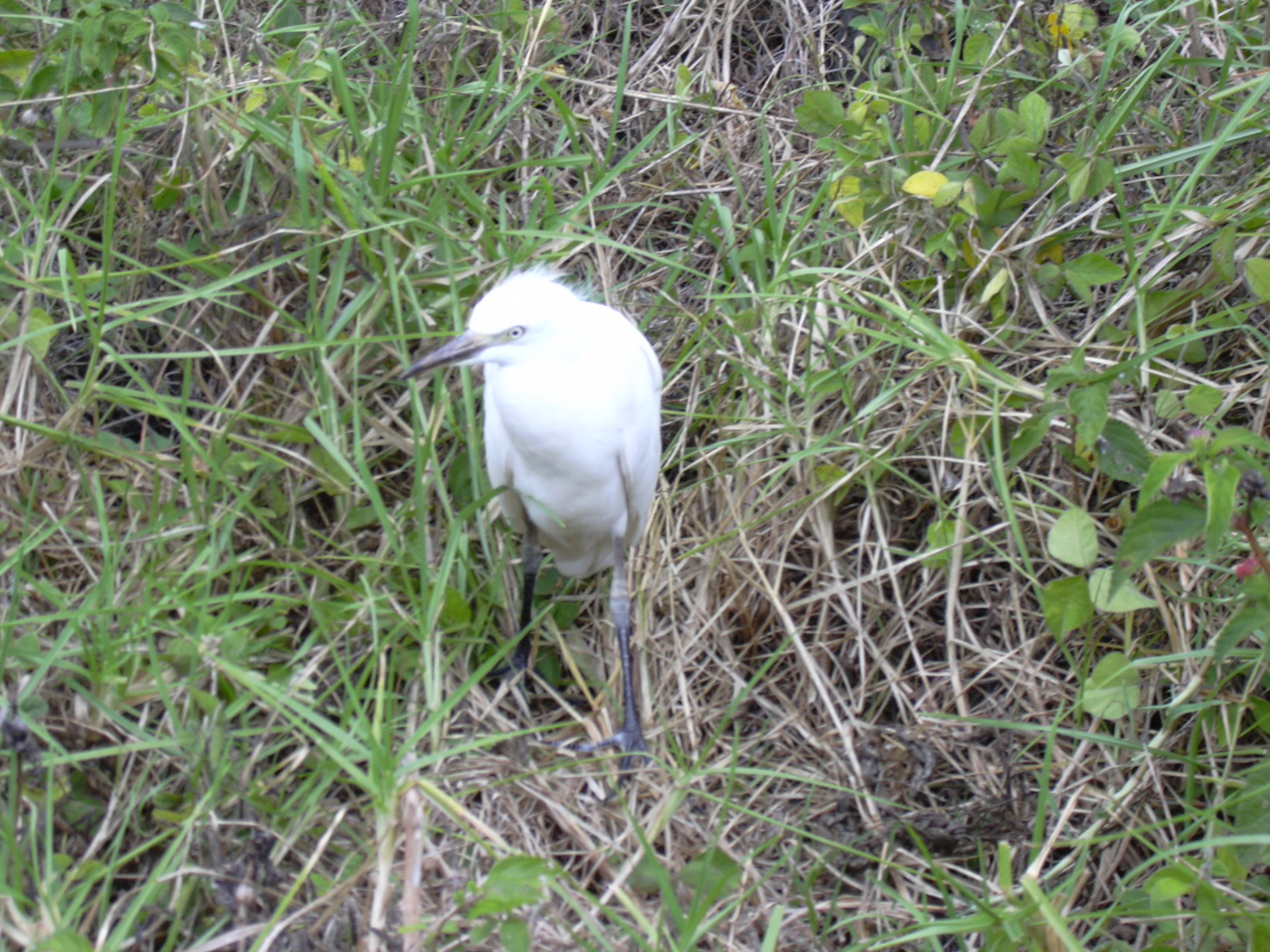
Juvenile western cattle egret on Maui; in some individuals, the bill is black for a short period after fledging.

== Migration and movements ==
Some populations of cattle egrets are migratory, others are dispersive, and distinguishing between the two can be difficult. In many areas, populations can be both sedentary and migratory. In the Northern Hemisphere, migration is from cooler climes to warmer areas, but cattle egrets nesting in Australia migrate to cooler Tasmania and New Zealand in the winter and return in the spring. Migration in western Africa is in response to rainfall, and in South America, migrating birds travel south of their breeding range in the nonbreeding season. Populations in southern India appear to show local migrations in response to the monsoons. They move north from Kerala after September. During winter, many birds have been seen flying at night with flocks of Indian pond herons (Ardeola grayii) on the south-eastern coast of India and a winter influx has also been noted in Sri Lanka.

Young birds are known to disperse up to 5,000 km (3,000 mi) from their breeding area. Flocks may fly vast distances and have been seen over seas and oceans including in the middle of the Atlantic.

== Ecology and behaviour ==
Multiple contact calls at a nighttime roost of western cattle egrets

=== Voice ===
Cattle egrets give a quiet, throaty rick-rack call at the breeding colony, but are otherwise largely silent.

=== Breeding ===
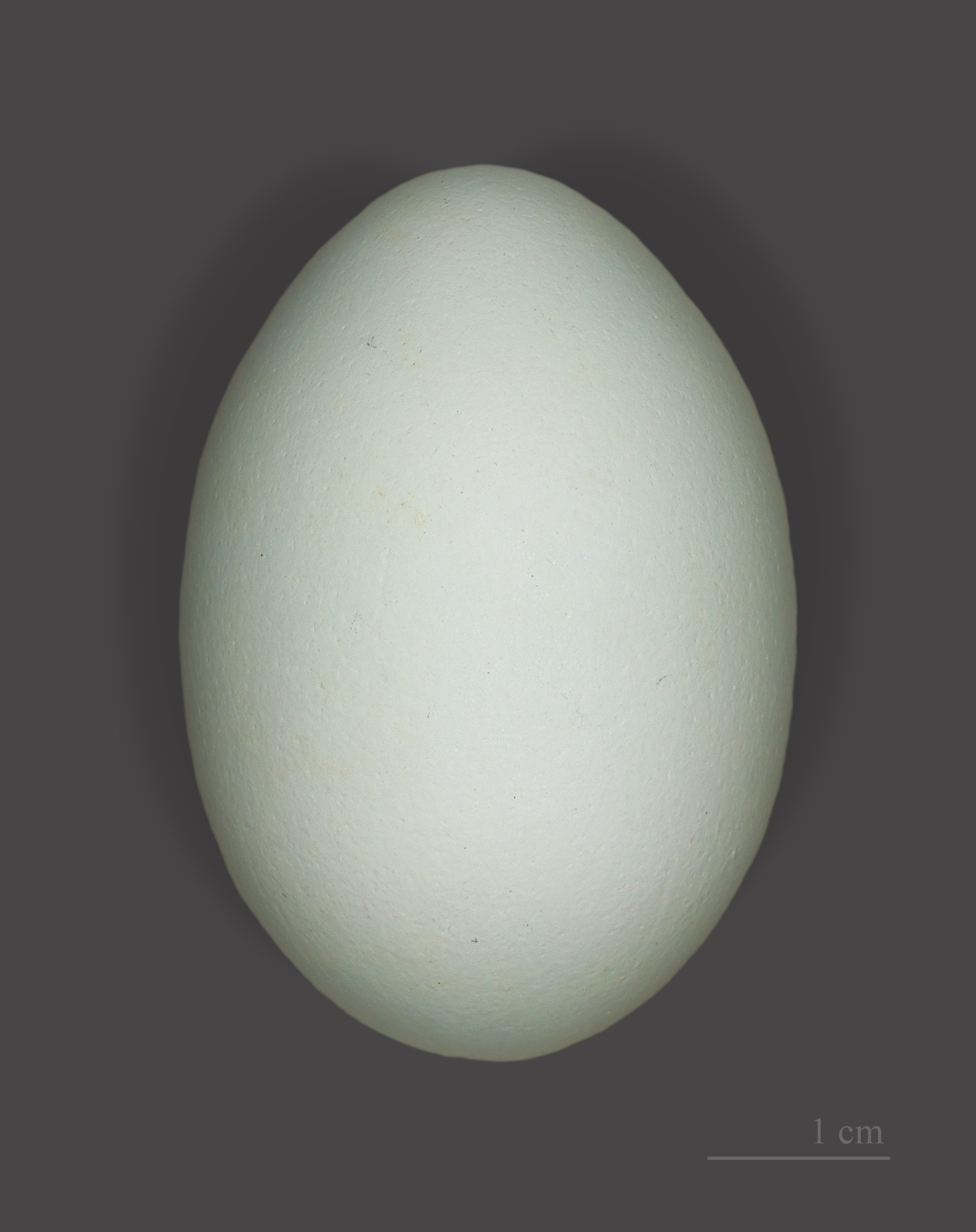
Western cattle egret egg, MHNT, from Morocco

Cattle egrets nests in colonies, which are often found around bodies of water. The colonies are usually found in woodlands near lakes or rivers, in swamps, or on small inland or coastal islands, and are sometimes shared with other wetland birds, such as herons, egrets, ibises, and cormorants. The breeding season varies within South Asia. Nesting in northern India begins with the onset of monsoons in May. The breeding season in Australia is November to early January, with one brood laid per season. The North American breeding season lasts from April to October. In the Seychelles, the breeding season is from April to October.

The male displays in a tree in the colony, using a range of ritualised behaviour, such as shaking a twig and sky-pointing (raising his bill vertically upwards), and the pair forms over 3–4 days. A new mate is chosen in each season and when renesting following nest failure. The nest is a small, untidy platform of sticks in a tree or shrub constructed by both parents. Sticks are collected by the male and arranged by the female, and stick-stealing is rife. The clutch size can be one to five eggs, although three or four is most common. The pale bluish-white eggs are oval-shaped and measure 45 mm × 53 mm (1 3/4 in × 2 in). Incubation lasts around 23 days, with both sexes sharing incubation duties. The chicks are partly covered with down at hatching, but are not capable of fending for themselves; they become capable of regulating their temperature at 9–12 days and are fully feathered in 13–21 days. They begin to leave the nest and climb around at 2 weeks, fledge at 30 days and become independent at around the 45th day.

Cattle egrets engage in low levels of brood parasitism, and a few instances have been reported of cattle egret eggs being laid in the nests of snowy egrets and little blue herons, although these eggs seldom hatch. Also, evidence of low levels of intraspecific brood parasitism has been found, with females laying eggs in the nests of other cattle egrets. As much as 30% extra-pair copulations has been noted.

The dominant factor in nesting mortality is starvation. Sibling rivalry can be intense, and in South Africa, third and fourth chicks inevitably starve. In the dryer habitats with fewer amphibians, the diet may lack sufficient vertebrate content and may cause bone abnormalities in growing chicks due to calcium deficiency. In Barbados, nests were sometimes raided by vervet monkeys, and a study in Florida reported the fish crow and black rat as other possible nest raiders. The same study attributed some nestling mortality to brown pelicans nesting in the vicinity, which accidentally, but frequently, dislodged nests or caused nestlings to fall. In Australia, Torresian crows, wedge-tailed eagles, and white-bellied sea eagles take eggs or young, and tick infestation and viral infections may also be causes of mortality.

=== Feeding ===
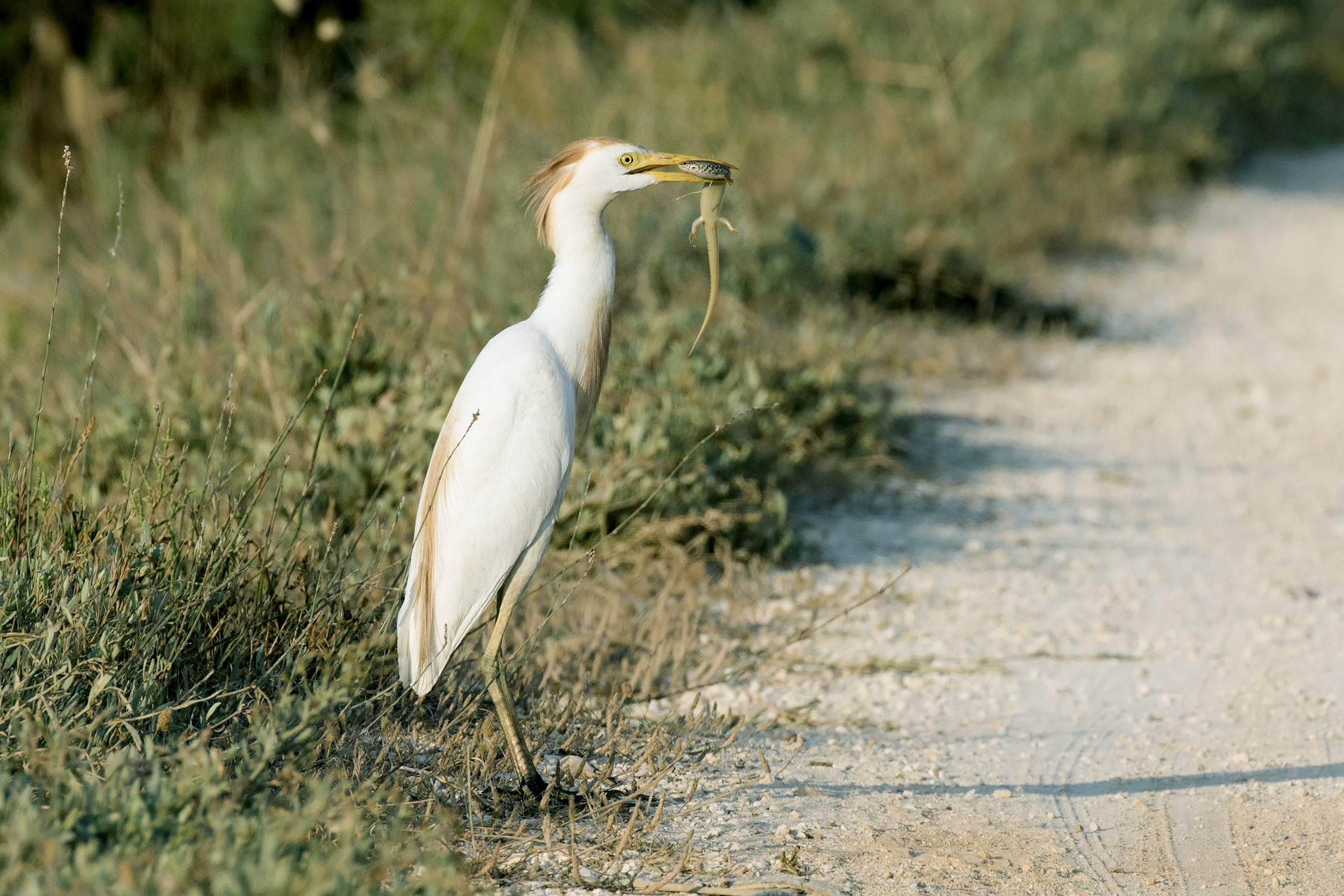
A western cattle egret eating a lizard in Turkey. Unlike most other herons, they frequently seek food on dry ground.

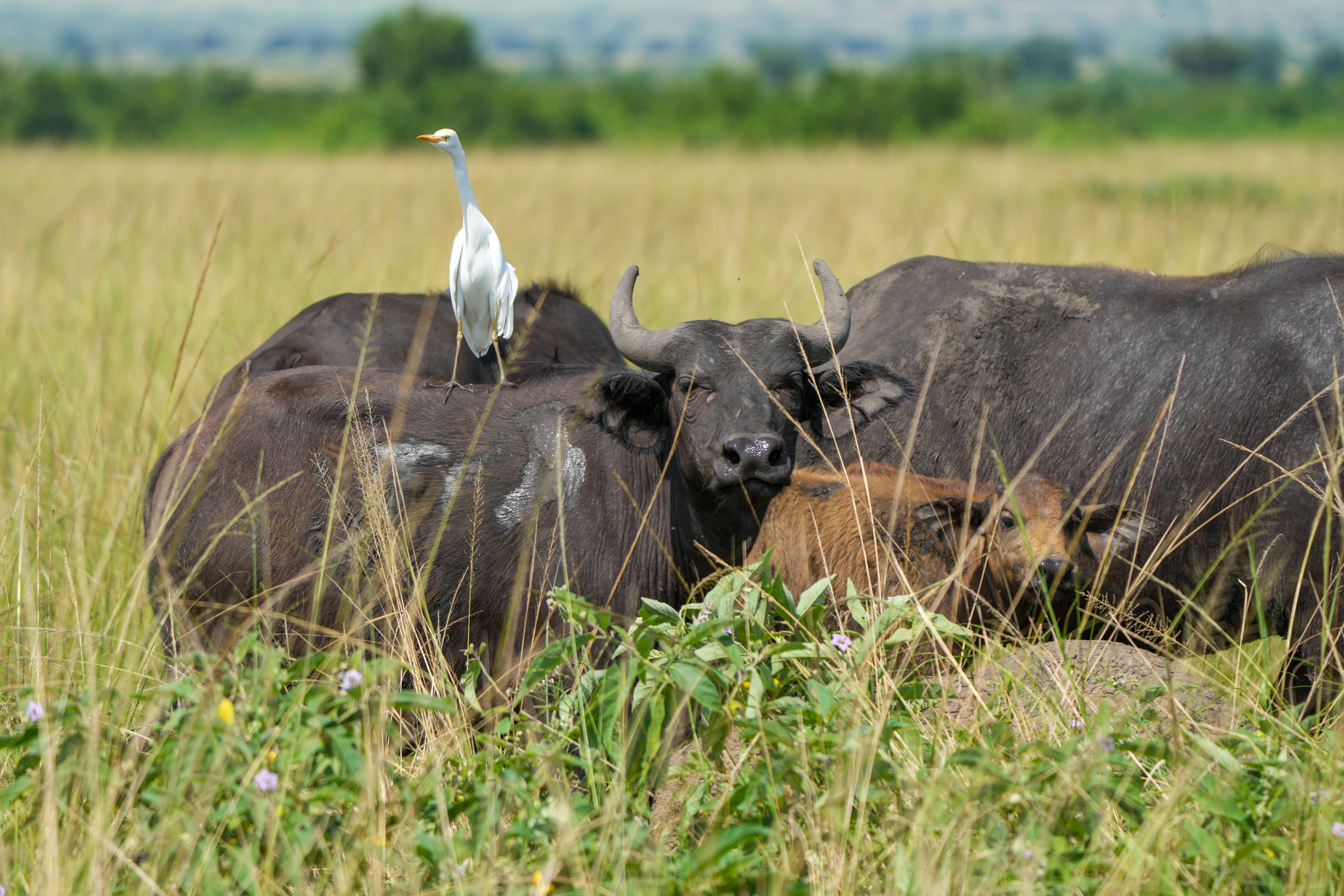
The natural association of cattle egrets is with large mammals: with African buffalo in Uganda.

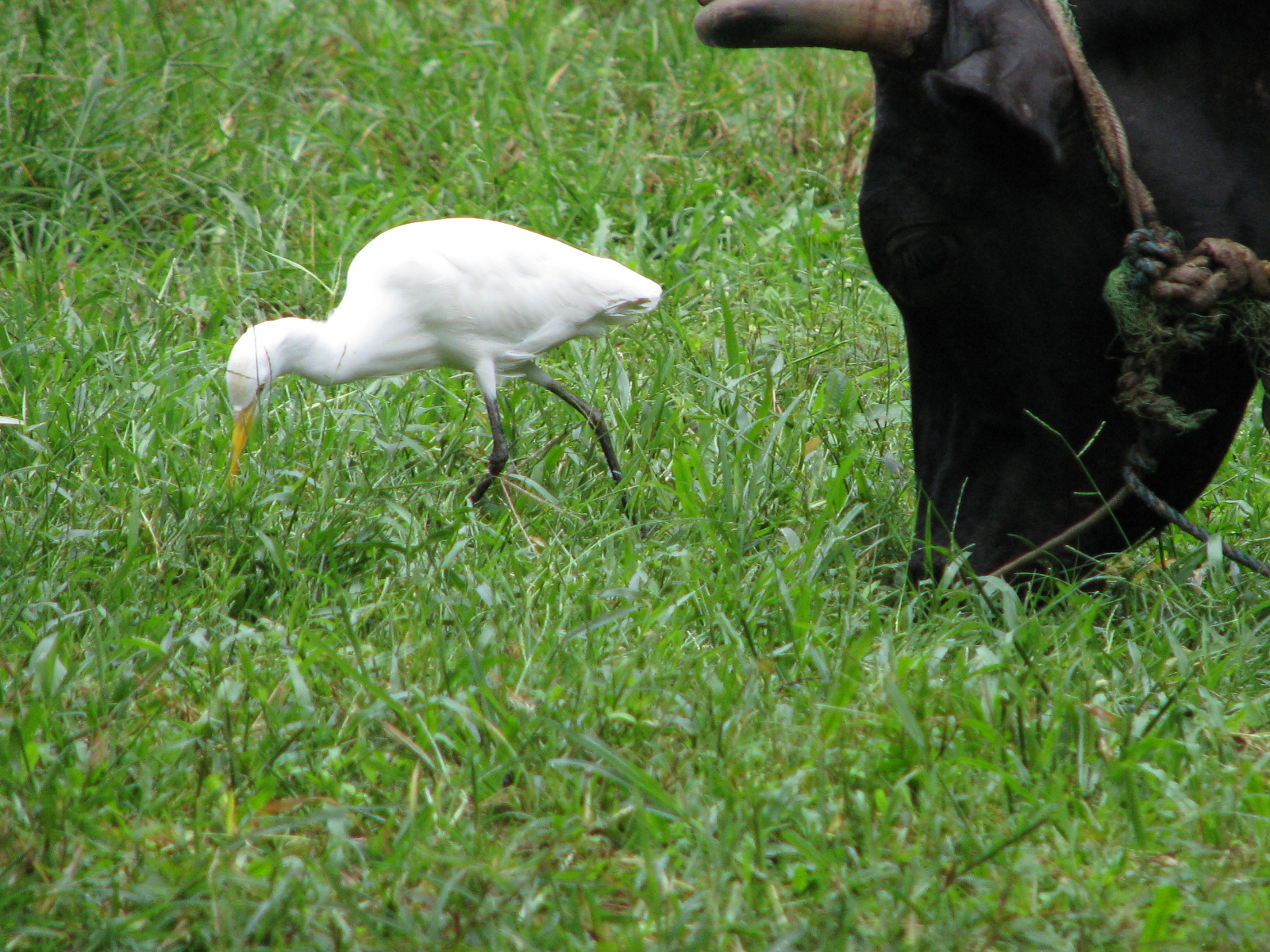
Human commensalism, stage 1: an eastern cattle egret with a domesticated cow in India

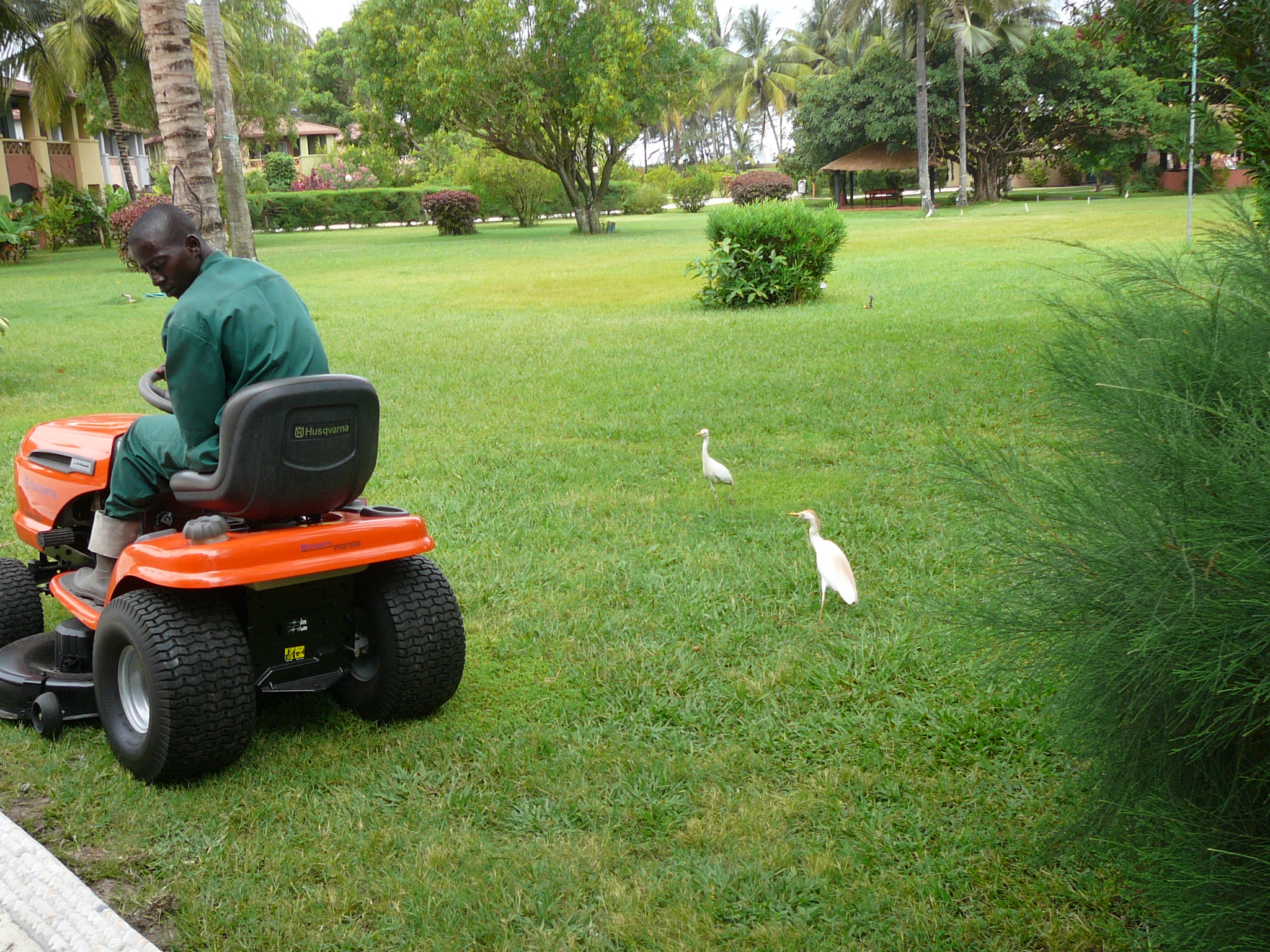
Human commensalism, stage 2: a lawnmower making a substitute for a large mammal, Gambia

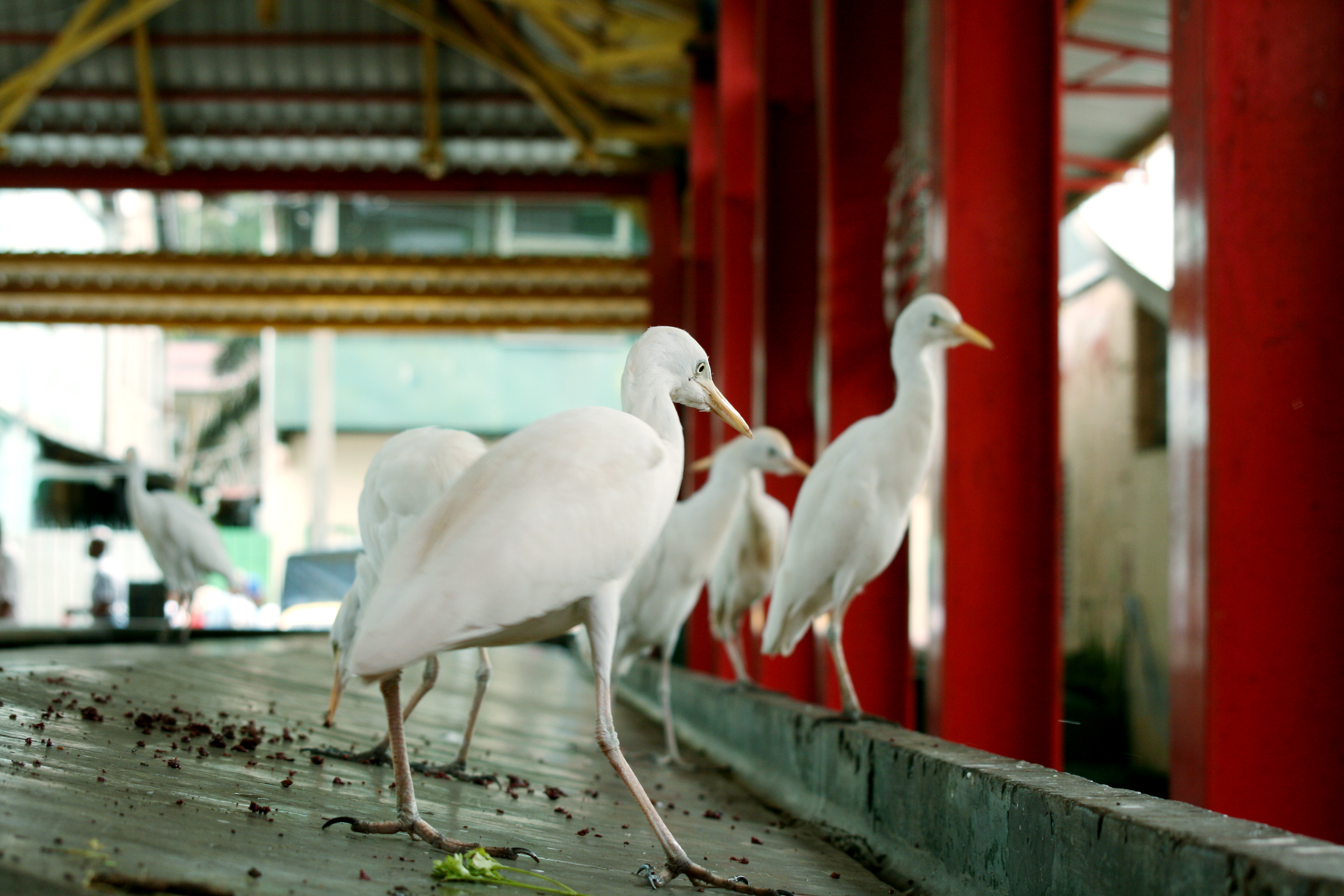
Deeper human commensalism: western cattle egrets waiting for scraps at the fish market of Victoria, Seychelles

Cattle egrets feed on a wide range of prey, particularly insects, especially grasshoppers, crickets, flies (adults and maggots), beetles, and moths, as well as spiders, frogs, fish, crayfish, small snakes, lizards and earthworms. In a rare instance, they have been observed foraging along the branches of a banyan tree for ripe figs. They are usually found with cattle and other large grazing and browsing animals, and catch small creatures disturbed by the mammals. Studies have shown that cattle egret foraging success is much higher when foraging near a large animal than when feeding singly. When foraging with cattle, it has been shown to be 3.6 times more successful in capturing prey than when foraging alone. Its performance is similar when it follows farm machinery, but it is forced to move more. In urban situations, cattle egrets have also been observed foraging in peculiar situations such as railway lines.

A cattle egret will weakly defend the area around a grazing animal against others of the same species, but if the area is swamped by egrets, it will give up and continue foraging elsewhere. Where numerous large animals are present, cattle egrets selectively forage around species that move at around 5–15 steps per minute, avoiding faster and slower moving herds; in Africa, cattle egrets selectively forage behind plains zebras, waterbuck, blue wildebeest and Cape buffalo. Dominant birds feed nearest to the host, and thus obtain more food.

Cattle egrets sometimes show versatility in their diet. On islands with seabird colonies, it will prey on the eggs and chicks of terns and other seabirds. During migration, it has also been reported to eat exhausted migrating landbirds. Birds on the Seychelles also indulge in some kleptoparasitism, chasing the chicks of sooty terns and forcing them to disgorge food.

=== Threats ===
Pairs of crested caracaras have been observed chasing cattle egrets in flight, forcing them to the ground, and killing them.

== Status ==
The IUCN Red List treats them as a single species. They have a large range, with an estimated global extent of occurrence of 355,000,000 km^{2} (100,000,000 sq mi). Their global population is estimated to be 3.8–6.7 million individuals. For these reasons, cattle egrets are evaluated as least concern. The expansion and establishment of cattle egrets over large ranges has led them to be classed as an invasive species, although little, if any, impact has been noted yet.

== Relationship with humans ==
As conspicuous birds, the cattle egrets have attracted many common names. These mostly relate to its habit of following cattle and other large animals, and it is known variously as cow crane, cow bird or cow heron, or even elephant bird or rhinoceros egret. Its Arabic name, abu qerdan, means "father of ticks", a name derived from the huge number of parasites such as avian ticks found in its breeding colonies. The Maasai people consider the presence of large numbers of cattle egrets as an indicator of impending drought and use it to decide on moving their cattle herds.

Cattle egrets are an occurring traditional motif in fishing boats among fishermen of the Malay Peninsula east coast who believed them as a symbol of good luck and fortune.

Cattle egrets are popular birds with cattle ranchers for their perceived role as a biocontrol of cattle parasites such as ticks and flies. A study in Australia found that cattle egrets reduced the number of flies that bothered cattle by pecking them directly off the skin. It was the benefit to stock that prompted ranchers and the Hawaiian Board of Agriculture and Forestry to release the western cattle egret in Hawaii.

Not all interactions between humans and cattle egrets are beneficial. The cattle egret can be a safety hazard to aircraft due to its habit of feeding in large groups in the grassy verges of airports, and it has been implicated in the spread of animal infections such as heartwater, infectious bursal disease, and possibly Newcastle disease.
