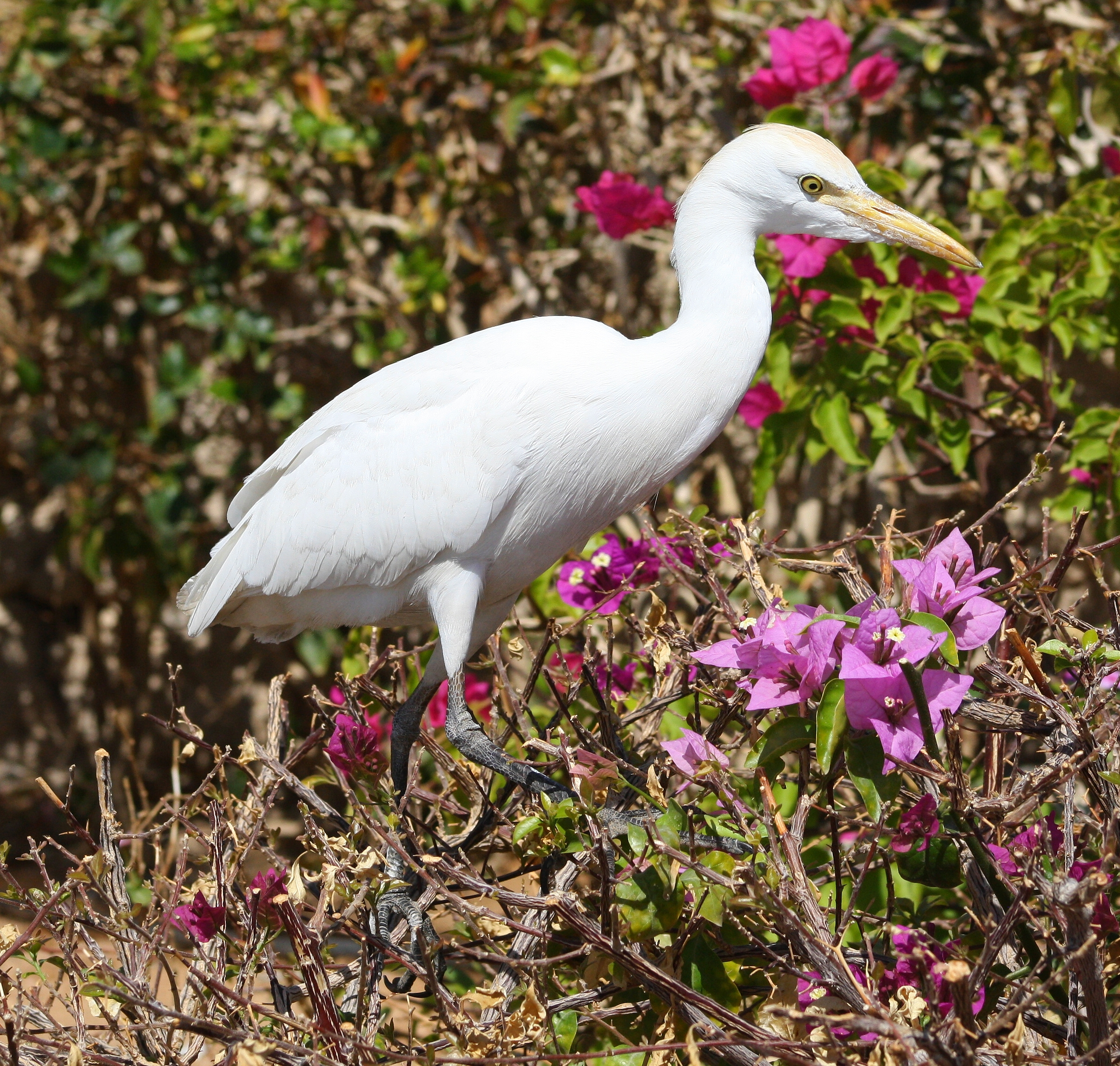
- Western cattle egret in Sharm El Sheikh, Egypt

Scientific classification
- Kingdom: Animalia
- Phylum: Chordata
- Class: Aves
- Order: Pelecaniformes
- Family: Ardeidae
- Genus: Ardea
- Species: A. ibis

Binomial name
- Ardea ibis Linnaeus, 1758
- Range of Bubulcus ibis

Synonyms
- Ardeola ibis (Linnaeus, 1758); Egretta ibis (Linnaeus, 1758); Lepterodatis ibis (Linnaeus, 1758); Bubulcus ibis (Linnaeus, 1758)

= Western cattle egret =

Species of bird

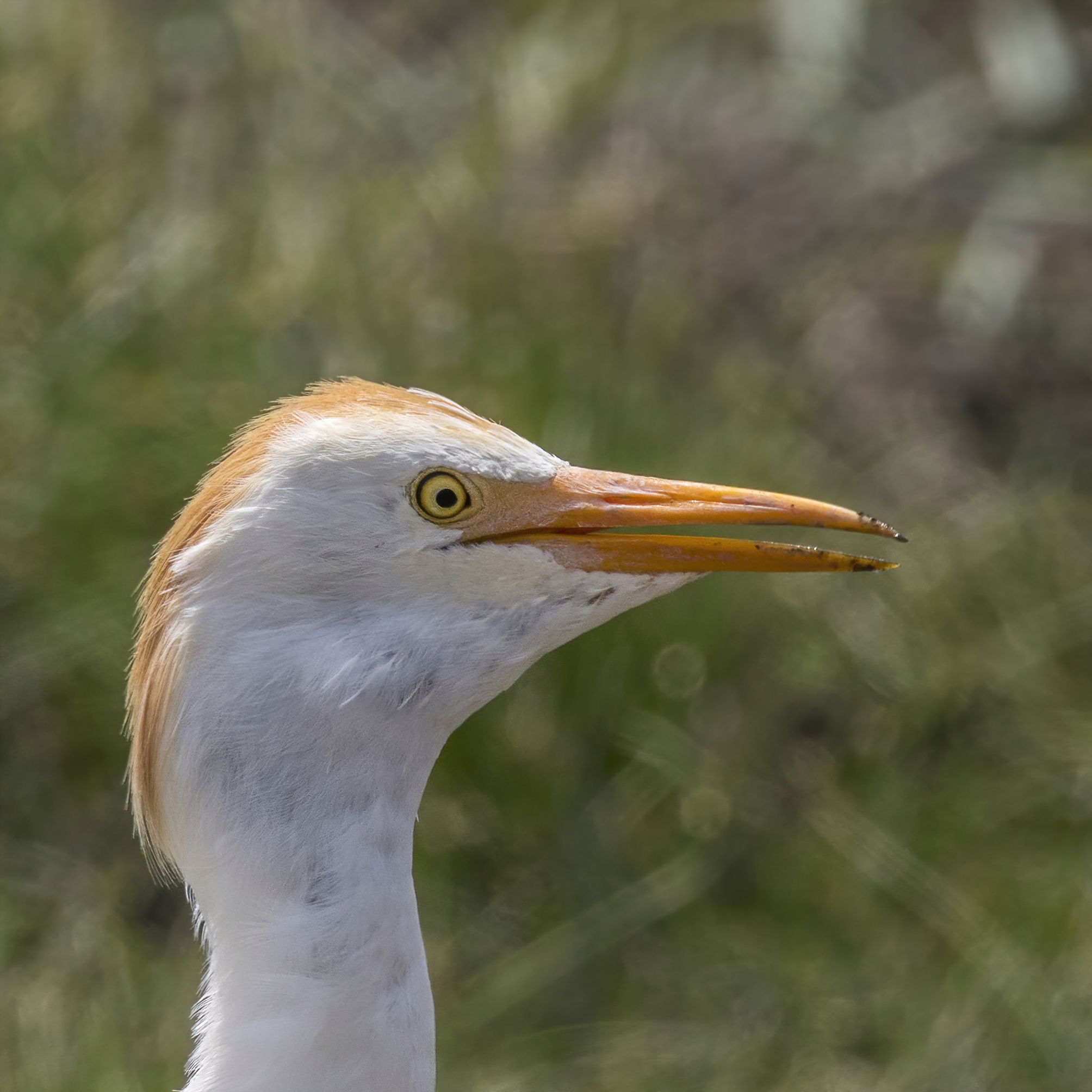
Summer plumage, Cyprus

The western cattle egret (Ardea ibis) is a species of heron (family Ardeidae) found in the tropics, subtropics and warm temperate zones. Formerly, most taxonomic authorities lumped this species and the eastern cattle egret together (called the cattle egret), but the two cattle egrets are now treated as separate species. Despite the similarities in plumage to the egrets of the genus Egretta, it is more closely related to the herons of Ardea. Originally native to parts of Africa, southwest Asia and southern Europe, it has undergone a rapid expansion in its distribution and successfully colonised much of the New World in the last century.

It is a white bird adorned with buff plumes in the breeding season. It nests in colonies, usually near bodies of water and often with other wading birds. The nest is a platform of sticks in trees or shrubs. Western cattle egrets exploit drier and open habitats more than other heron species. Their feeding habitats include seasonally inundated grasslands, pastures, farmlands, wetlands and rice paddies. They often accompany cattle or other large mammals, catching insect and small vertebrate prey disturbed by these animals. Some populations of the cattle egret are migratory and others show post-breeding dispersal.

The adult cattle egret has few predators, but birds or mammals may raid its nests, and chicks may be lost to starvation, calcium deficiency or disturbance from other large birds. This species maintains a special relationship with cattle, which extends to other large grazing mammals; wider human farming is believed to be a major cause of their suddenly expanded range. The cattle egret removes ticks and flies from cattle and consumes them. This benefits both species, but it has been implicated in the spread of tick-borne animal diseases.

== Taxonomy ==
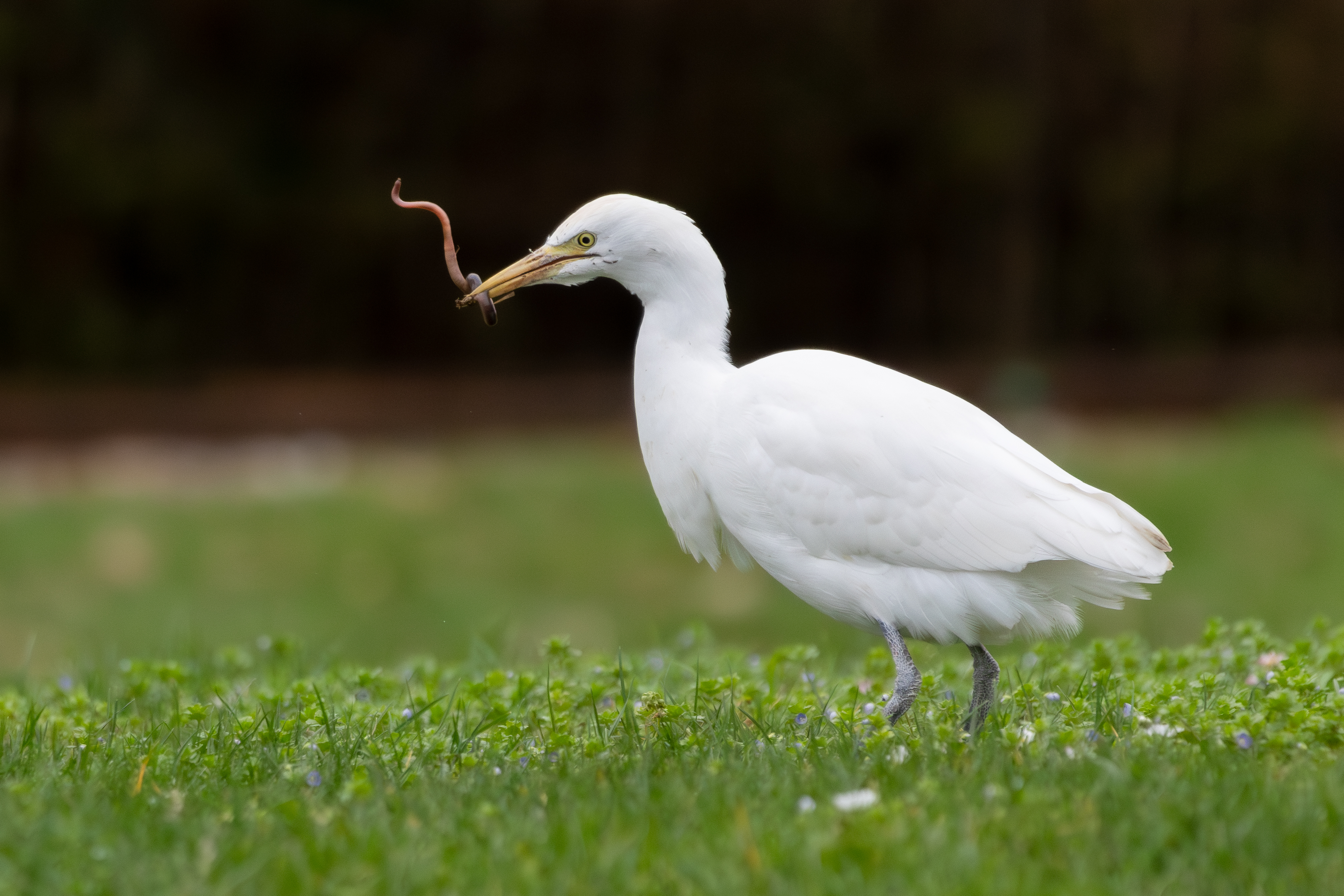
Adult in winter plumage, France

The cattle egret was first described in 1758 by Linnaeus in his Systema naturae as Ardea ibis, based on specimens from Egypt. It was transferred to the genus Bubulcus by Charles Lucien Bonaparte in 1855, but then moved back to the genus Ardea based on the results of a molecular phylogenetic study published in 2023 that found the cattle egrets were embedded with members of the genus Ardea. The genus name Ardea is the Latin word for a "heron". Ibis is a Latin and Greek word which originally referred to another white wading bird, the sacred ibis, but was applied to this species in error.

Despite superficial similarities in appearance, the cattle egret is more closely related to the genus Ardea, which comprises the great or typical herons and the great egret (A. alba), than to the majority of species termed egrets in the genus Egretta. Rare cases of hybridization with little blue herons Egretta caerulea, little egrets Egretta garzetta and snowy egrets Egretta thula have been recorded.

== Description ==
The cattle egret is a stocky heron with an 88–96 cm (35–38 in) wingspan; it is 46–56 cm (18–22 in) long and weighs 270–512 g (9.5–18.1 oz). It has a relatively short thick neck, a sturdy bill, and a hunched posture. The non-breeding adult has mainly white plumage, a yellow bill and greyish-yellow legs. During the breeding season, adults of the nominate western subspecies develop orange-buff plumes on the back, breast and crown, and the bill, legs and irises become bright red for a brief period prior to pairing. The sexes are similar, but the male is marginally larger and has slightly longer breeding plumes than the female; juvenile birds lack coloured plumes and have a black bill.

The positioning of the egret's eyes allows for binocular vision during feeding, and physiological studies suggest that the species may be capable of crepuscular or nocturnal activity. Adapted to foraging on land, they have lost the ability possessed by their wetland relatives to correct for light refraction by water accurately.

This species gives a quiet, throaty rick-rack call at the breeding colony, but is otherwise largely silent.

== Distribution and habitat ==
Range expansion in the Americas (click to magnify)

The cattle egret has undergone one of the most rapid and wide reaching natural expansions of any bird species. It was originally native to parts of southern Spain and Portugal, tropical and subtropical Africa and western Asia. In the end of the 19th century it began expanding its range into southern Africa, first breeding in the Cape Province in 1908. Cattle egrets were first sighted in the Americas on the boundary of Guiana and Suriname in 1877, having apparently flown across the Atlantic Ocean. It was not until the 1930s that the species is thought to have become established in that area.

The species first arrived in North America in 1941; these early sightings were originally dismissed as escapees. It first bred in Florida in 1953, and spread rapidly, breeding for the first time in Canada in 1962. It is now commonly seen as far west as California. It was first recorded breeding in Cuba in 1957, in Costa Rica in 1958, and in Mexico in 1963, although it was probably established before that. In Europe, the species had historically declined in Spain and Portugal, but in the latter part of the 20th century it expanded back through the Iberian Peninsula, and then began to colonise other parts of Europe; southern France in 1958, northern France in 1981 and Italy in 1985. Breeding in the United Kingdom was recorded for the first time in 2008 only a year after an influx seen in the previous year. In 2008, cattle egrets were also reported as having moved into Ireland for the first time.

The massive and rapid expansion of the cattle egret's range is due to its relationship with humans and their domesticated animals. Originally adapted to a commensal relationship with large grazing and browsing animals, it was easily able to switch to domesticated cattle and horses. As the keeping of livestock spread throughout the world, the cattle egret was able to occupy otherwise empty niches. Many populations of cattle egrets are highly migratory and dispersive, and this has helped the species' range expansion. The species has been seen as a vagrant in various sub-Antarctic islands, including South Georgia, Marion Island, the South Sandwich Islands and the South Orkney Islands. A small flock of eight birds was also seen in Fiji in 2008.

In addition to the natural expansion of its range, cattle egrets have been deliberately introduced into a few areas. The species was introduced to Hawaii in 1959. Successful releases were also made in the Seychelles and Rodrigues, but attempts to introduce the species to Mauritius failed. Numerous birds were also released by Whipsnade Zoo in England, but the species was never established.

Although the cattle egret sometimes feeds in shallow water, unlike most herons it is typically found in fields and dry grassy habitats, reflecting its greater dietary reliance on terrestrial insects rather than aquatic prey.

== Migration and movements ==
Some populations of cattle egrets are migratory, others are dispersive, and distinguishing between the two can be difficult for this species. In many areas populations can be both sedentary and migratory. In the northern hemisphere, migration is from cooler climes to warmer areas. Migration in western Africa is in response to rainfall, and in South America migrating birds travel south of their breeding range in the non-breeding season.

Young birds are known to disperse up to 5,000 km (3,100 mi) from their breeding area. Flocks may fly vast distances and have been seen over seas and oceans including in the middle of the Atlantic.

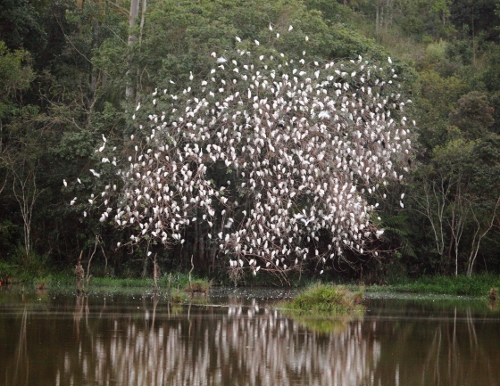
A flock in a tree at Jacutinga, Minas Gerais state, Brazil

== Status ==
This species has a large range, with an estimated global extent of occurrence of 10,000,000 km^{2} (3,900,000 sq mi). Recent expansion has resulted in populations being established far beyond its native range.

It is not clear whether this species should be considered invasive in areas it has recently colonized. Introduced populations seem to have little to no impact on native ecologies, and competition with native herons is minimal because of the unique nesting habits of cattle egrets.

== Breeding ==
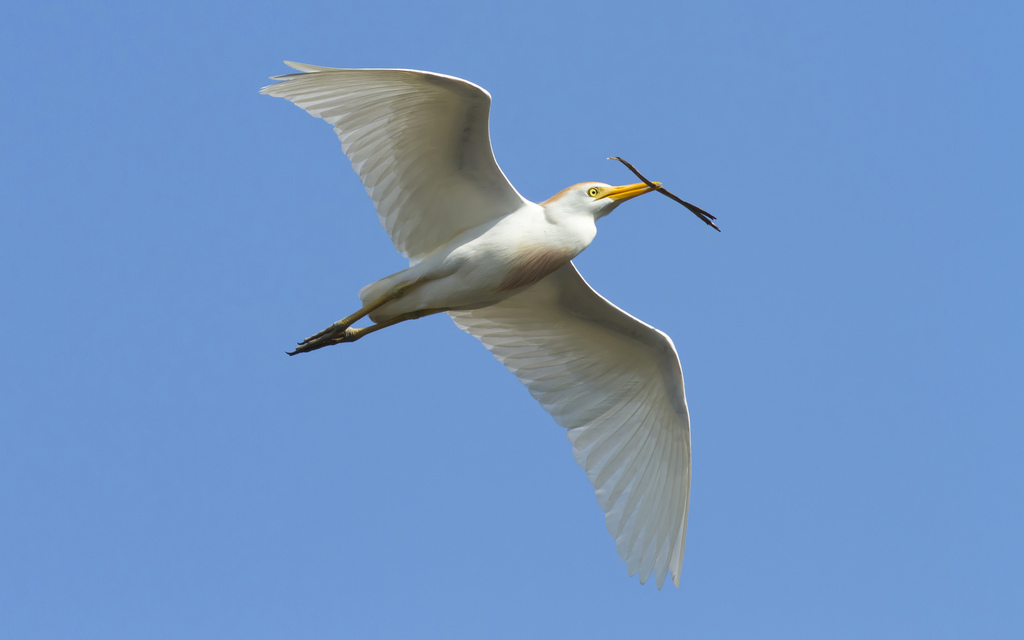
Flying in Dallas, Texas, with a twig in its beak for its nest

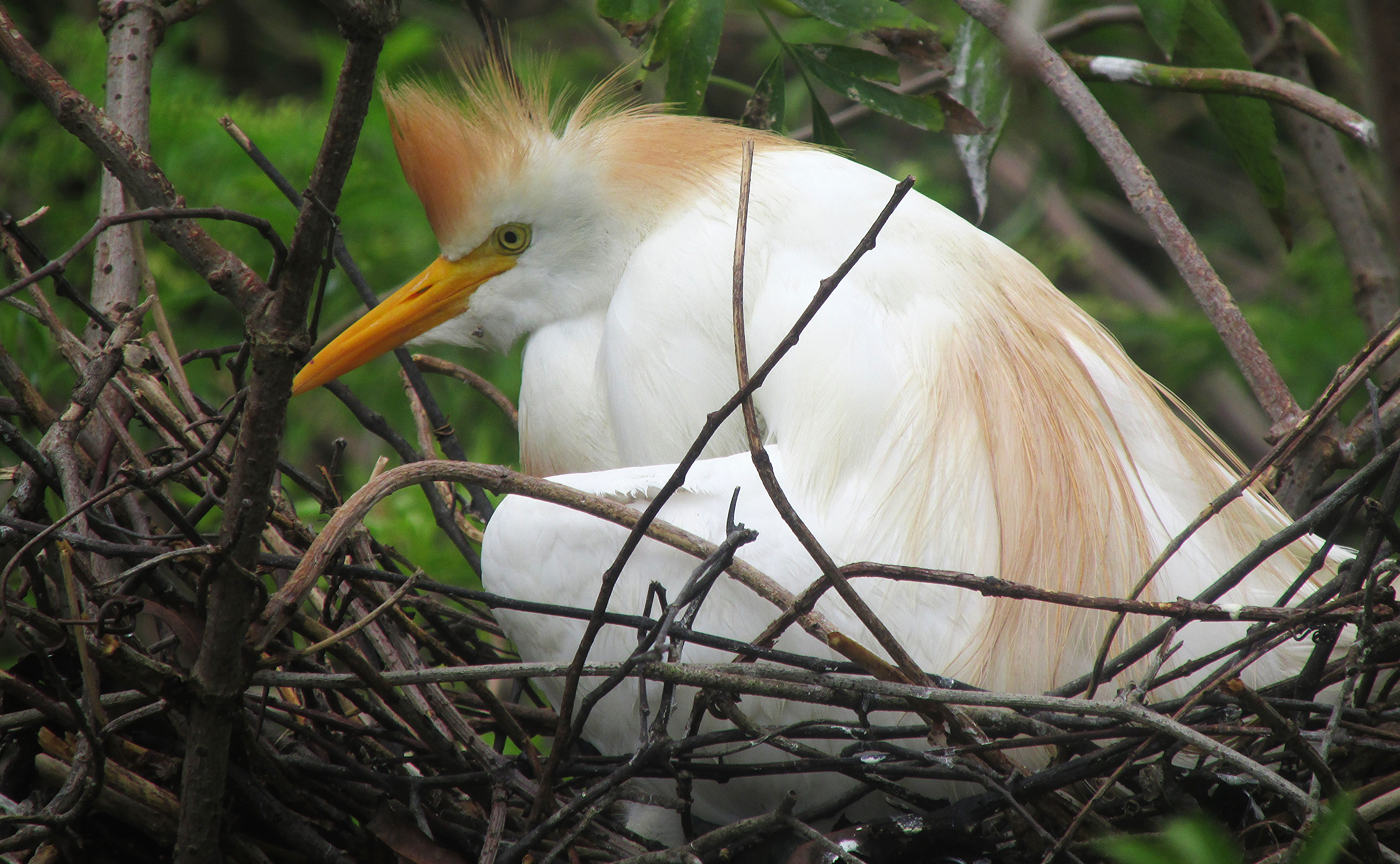
Adult on nest, Orlando, Florida

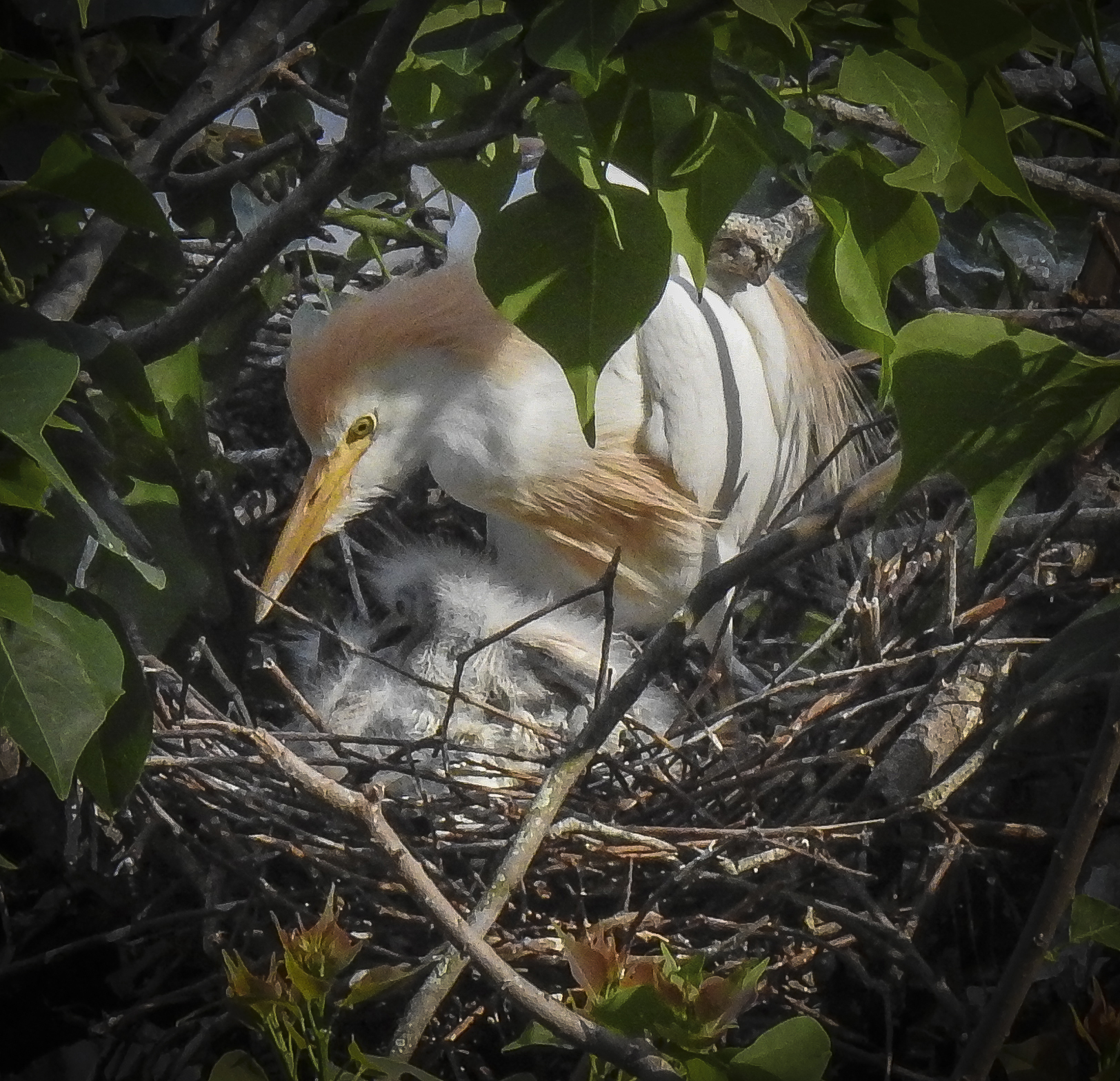
Adult with chicks, Tampa, Florida

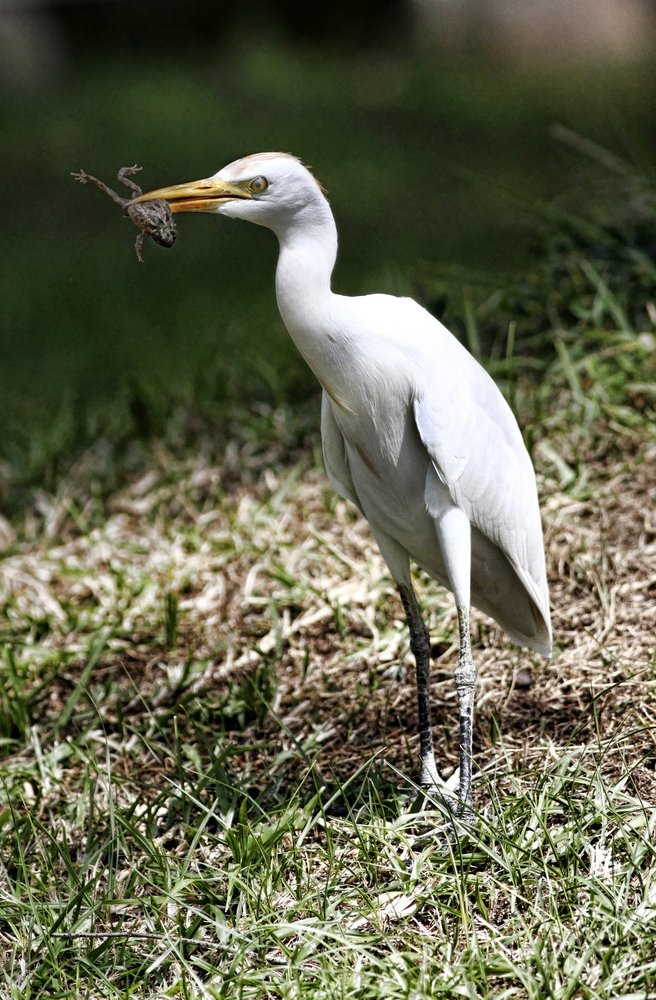
Eating a frog in the Gambia

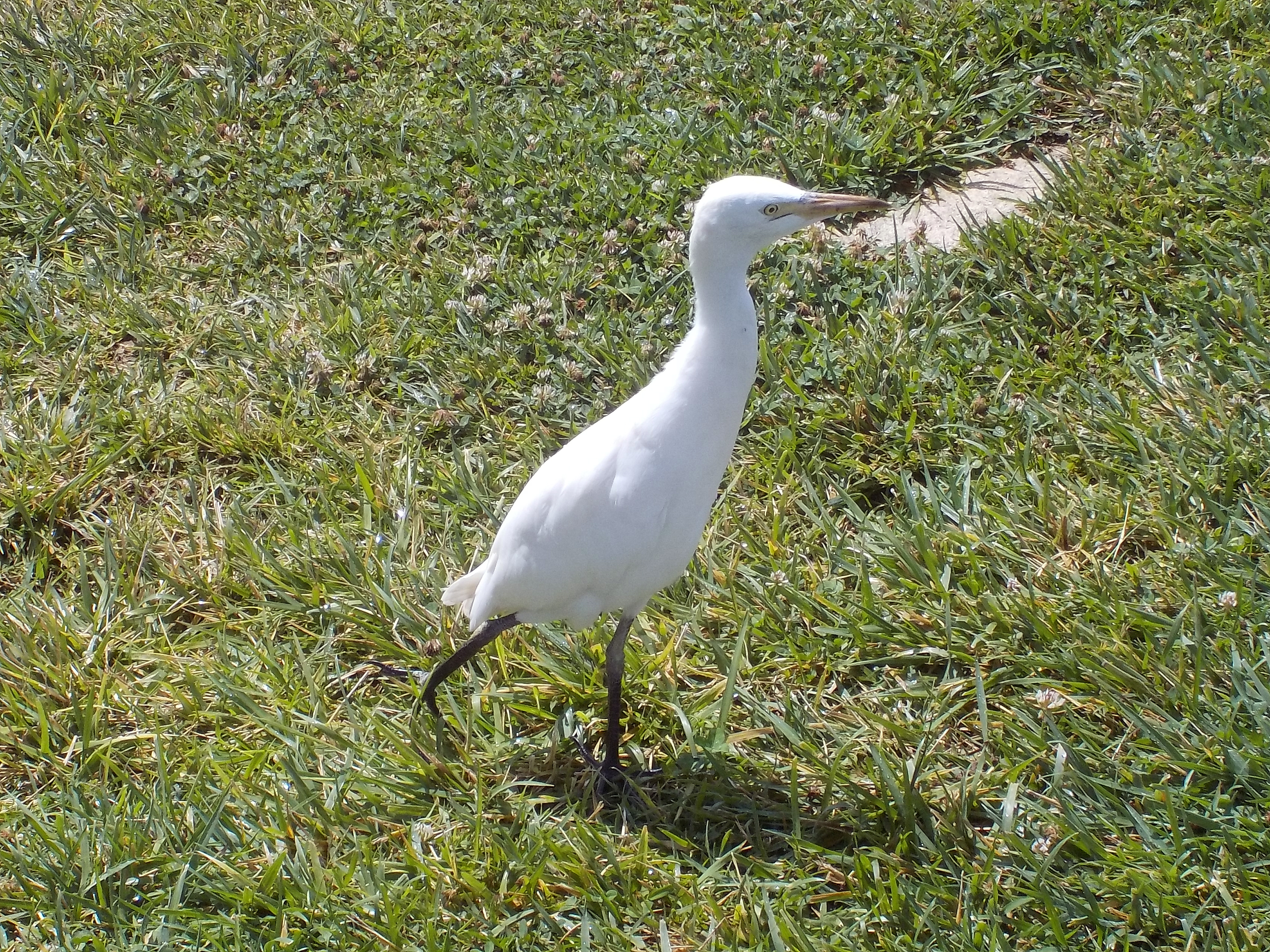
Juvenile in Italy; when newly fledged, it has a black bill, but this soon turns yellow from the base

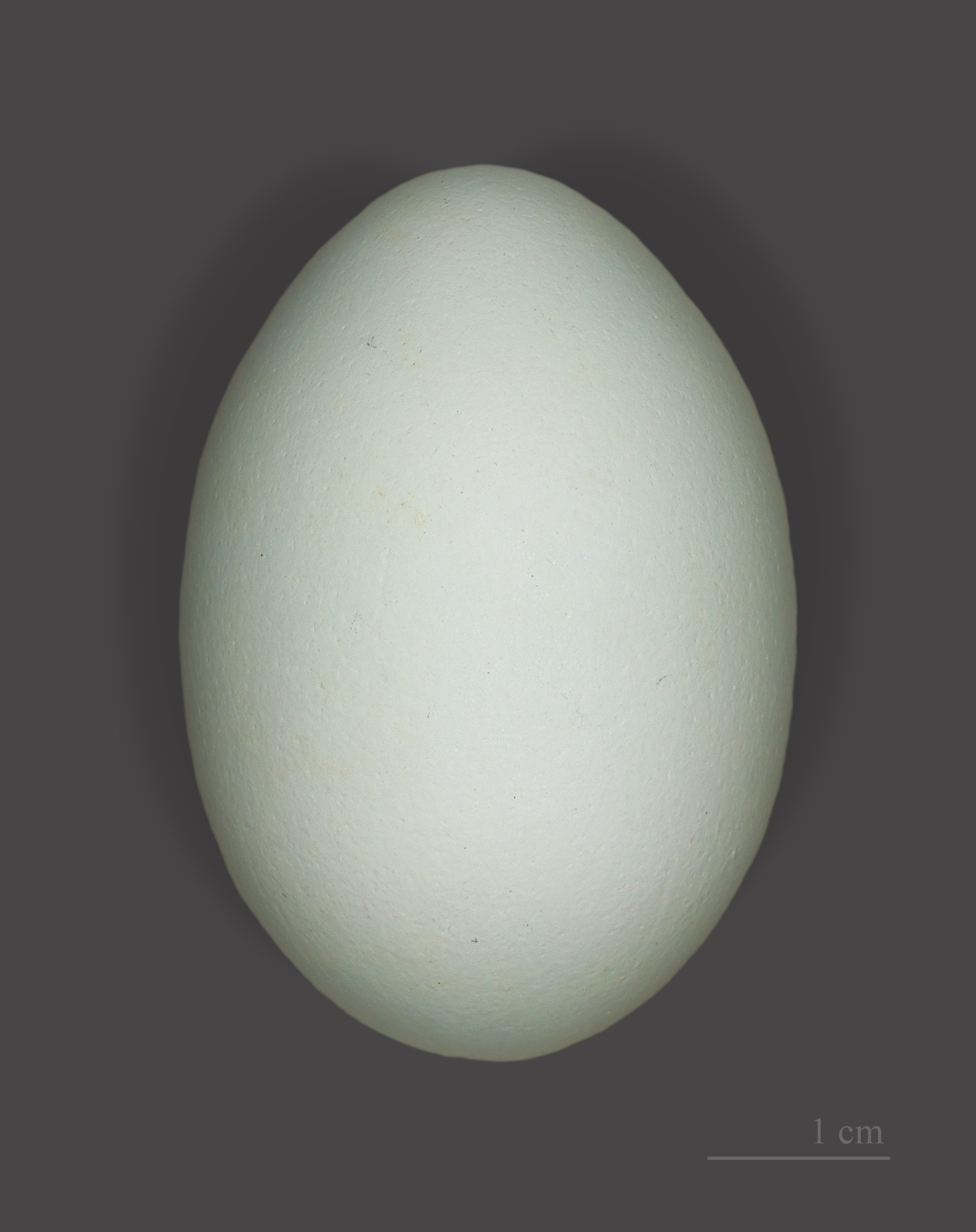
Cattle egret egg

The cattle egret nests in colonies, which are often, but not always, found around bodies of water. The colonies are usually found in woodlands near lakes or rivers, in swamps, or on small inland or coastal islands, and are sometimes shared with other wetland birds, such as herons, egrets, ibises and cormorants. The North American breeding season lasts from April to October. In the Seychelles, the breeding season is April to October.

The male displays in a tree in the colony, using a range of ritualised behaviour such as shaking a twig and sky-pointing (raising his bill vertically upwards), and the pair forms over three or four days. A new mate is chosen in each season and when re-nesting following nest failure. The nest is a small untidy platform of sticks in a tree or shrub constructed by both parents. Sticks are collected by the male and arranged by the female, and stick-stealing is rife. The clutch size can be anywhere from one to five eggs, although three or four is most common. The pale bluish-white eggs are oval-shaped and measure 45 mm × 53 mm (1.8 in × 2.1 in). Incubation lasts around 23 days, with both sexes sharing incubation duties. The chicks are partly covered with down at hatching, but are not capable of fending for themselves; they become capable of regulating their temperature at 9–12 days and are fully feathered in 13–21 days. They begin to leave the nest and climb around at 2 weeks, fledge at 30 days and become independent at around the 45th day.

The cattle egret engages in low levels of brood parasitism, and there are a few instances of cattle egret eggs being laid in the nests of snowy egrets and little blue herons, although these eggs seldom hatch. There is also evidence of low levels of intraspecific brood parasitism, with females laying eggs in the nests of other cattle egrets. As much as 30% extra-pair copulations have been noted.

The dominant factor in nesting mortality is starvation. Sibling rivalry can be intense, and in South Africa third and fourth chicks inevitably starve. In the dryer habitats with fewer amphibians the diet may lack sufficient vertebrate content and may cause bone abnormalities in growing chicks due to calcium deficiency. In Barbados, nests were sometimes raided by vervet monkeys, and a study in Florida reported the fish crow and black rat as other possible nest raiders. The same study attributed some nestling mortality to brown pelicans nesting in the vicinity, which accidentally, but frequently, dislodged nests or caused nestlings to fall.

== Feeding ==
The cattle egret feeds on a wide range of prey, particularly insects, especially grasshoppers, crickets, flies (adults and maggots), and moths, as well as spiders, frogs, and earthworms. In a rare instance they have been observed foraging along the branches of a banyan tree for ripe figs. The species is usually found with cattle and other large grazing and browsing animals, and catches small creatures disturbed by the mammals. Studies have shown that cattle egret foraging success is much higher when foraging near a large animal than when feeding singly. When foraging with cattle, it has been shown to be 3.6 times more successful in capturing prey than when foraging alone. Its performance is similar when it follows farm machinery, but it is forced to move more. In urban situations cattle egrets have also been observed foraging in peculiar situations like railway lines.

A cattle egret will weakly defend the area around a grazing animal against others of the same species, but if the area is swamped by egrets it will give up and continue foraging elsewhere. Where numerous large animals are present, cattle egrets selectively forage around species that move at around 5–15 steps per minute, avoiding faster and slower moving herds; in Africa, cattle egrets selectively forage behind plains zebras, waterbuck, blue wildebeest and Cape buffalo. Dominant birds feed nearest to the host, and obtain more food.

The cattle egret may also show versatility in its diet. On islands with seabird colonies, it will prey on the eggs and chicks of terns and other seabirds. During migration it has also been reported to eat exhausted migrating landbirds. Birds of the Seychelles race also indulge in some kleptoparasitism, chasing the chicks of sooty terns and forcing them to disgorge food.

== Relationship with humans ==
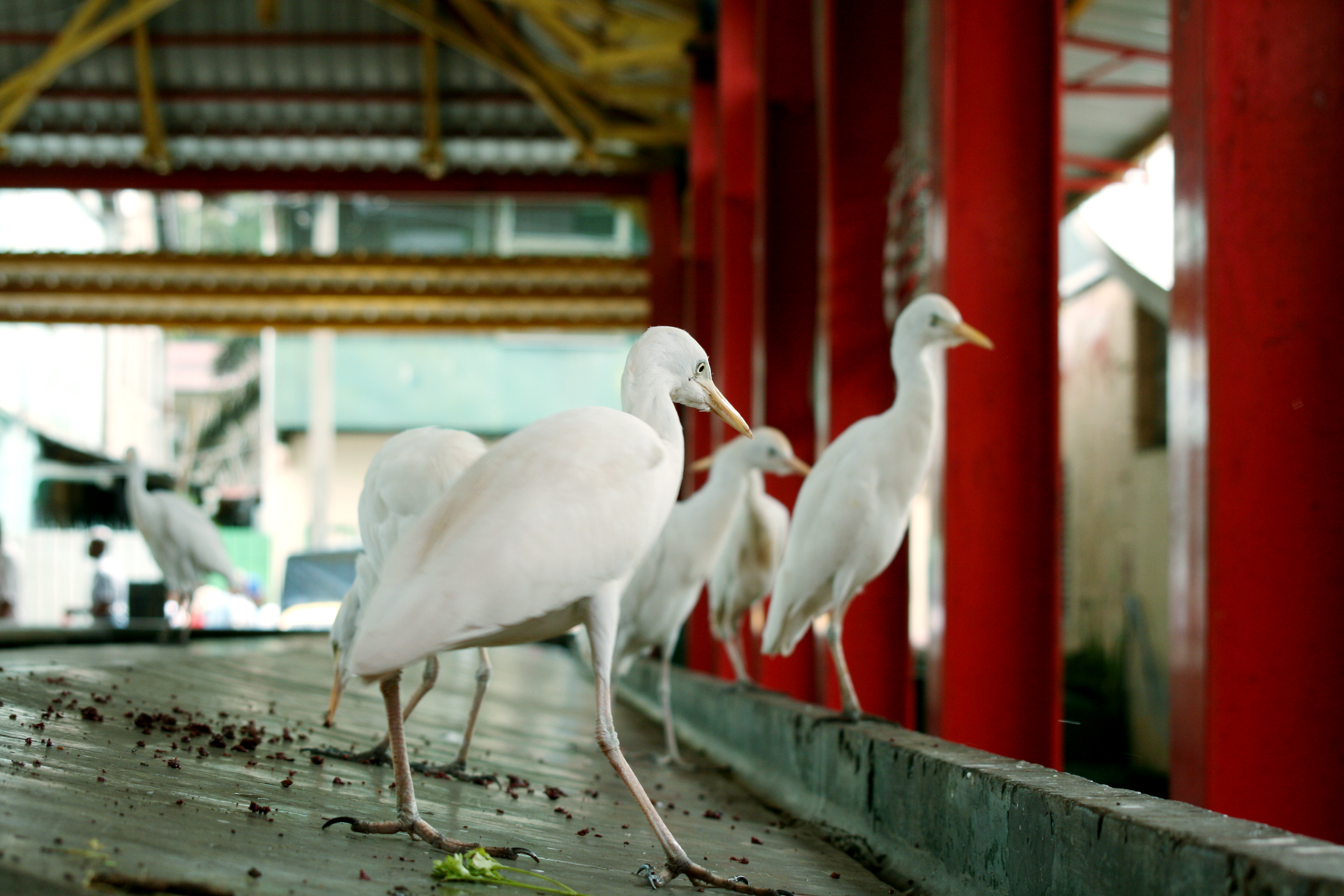
Western cattle egrets waiting for scraps at the fish market of Victoria, Seychelles

A conspicuous species, the cattle egret has attracted many common names. These mostly relate to its habit of following cattle and other large animals, and it is known variously as cow crane, cow bird or cow heron, or even elephant bird or rhinoceros egret. Its Arabic name, abu qerdan, means "father of ticks", a name derived from the huge number of parasites such as avian ticks found in its breeding colonies.

The cattle egret is a popular bird with cattle ranchers for its perceived role as a biocontrol of cattle parasites such as ticks and flies. A study in Australia found that cattle egrets reduced the number of flies that bothered cattle by pecking them directly off the skin. It was the benefit to stock that prompted ranchers and the Hawaiian Board of Agriculture and Forestry to release the species in Hawaii.

Not all interactions between humans and cattle egrets are beneficial. The cattle egret can be a safety hazard to aircraft due to its habit of feeding in large groups in the grassy verges of airports, and it has been implicated in the spread of animal infections such as heartwater, infectious bursal disease and possibly Newcastle disease.
