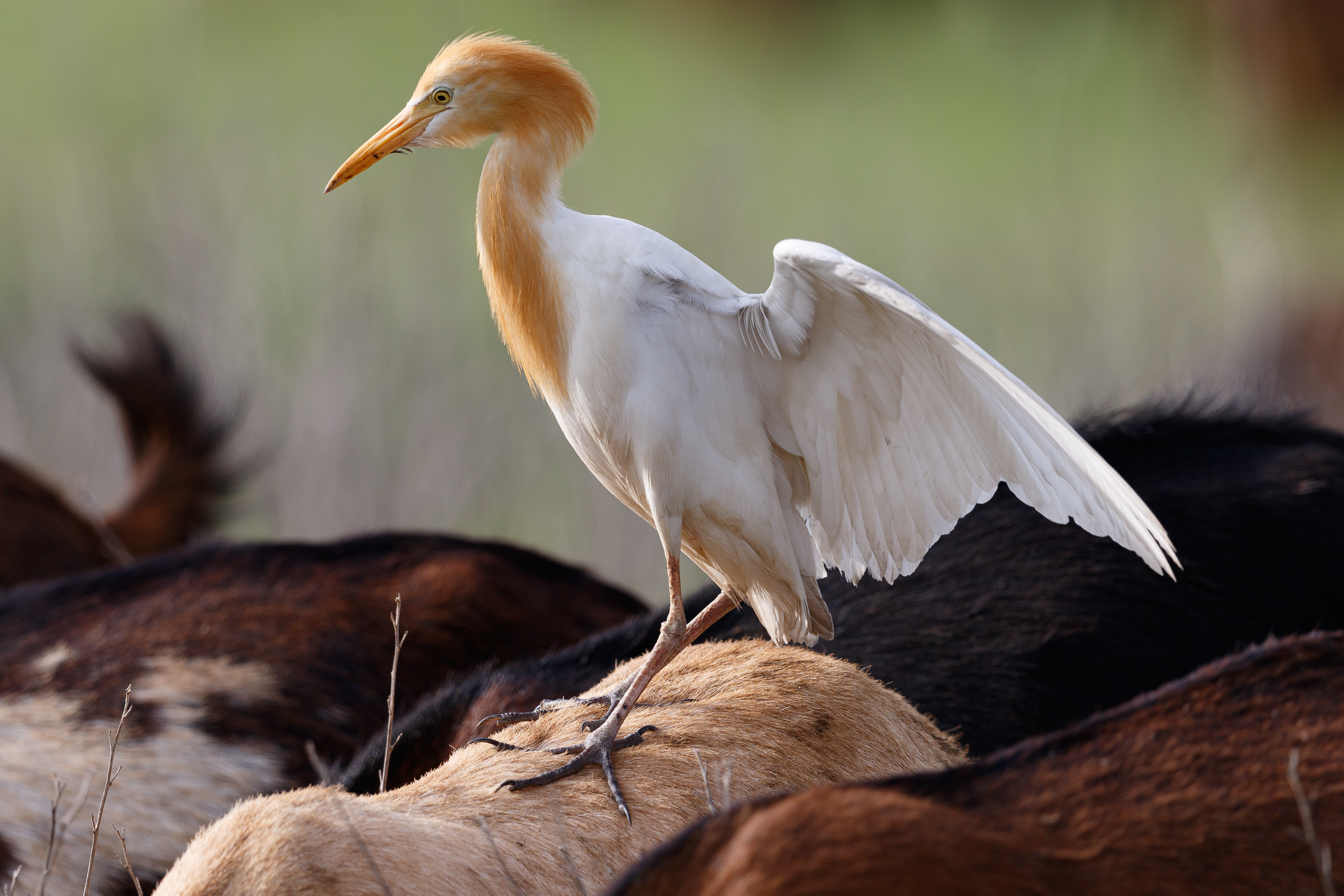
- Eastern cattle egret, perched on a goat, near Hyderabad, India

Scientific classification
- Kingdom: Animalia
- Phylum: Chordata
- Class: Aves
- Order: Pelecaniformes
- Family: Ardeidae
- Genus: Ardea
- Species: A. coromanda

Binomial name
- Ardea coromanda (Boddaert, 1783)
- Range of Ardea coromanda Breeding range Year-round range Wintering range

Synonyms
- Bubulcus ibis coromandus; Bubulcus coromandus

= Eastern cattle egret =

Species of bird

The eastern cattle egret (Ardea coromanda) is a species of heron (family Ardeidae) found in the tropics, subtropics and warm temperate zones. Formerly, most taxonomic authorities lumped this species and the western cattle egret together (called the cattle egret), but the two cattle egrets are now treated as separate species. Despite the similarities in plumage to the egrets of the genus Egretta, it is more closely related to the herons of Ardea. It is native to southern and eastern Asia, and Australasia.

It is a white bird adorned with buff plumes in the breeding season. It nests in colonies, usually near bodies of water and often with other wading birds. The nest is a platform of sticks in trees or shrubs. Eastern cattle egrets exploit drier and open habitats more than other heron species. Their feeding habitats include seasonally inundated grasslands, pastures, farmlands, wetlands and rice paddies. They often accompany cattle or other large mammals, catching insect and small vertebrate prey disturbed by these animals. Some populations of the cattle egret are migratory and others show post-breeding dispersal.

The adult eastern cattle egret has few predators, but birds or mammals may raid its nests, and chicks may be lost to starvation, calcium deficiency or disturbance from other large birds. This species maintains a special relationship with cattle, which extends to other large grazing mammals; wider human farming is believed to be a major cause of their suddenly expanded range. The cattle egret removes ticks and flies from cattle and consumes them. This benefits both species, but it has been implicated in the spread of tick-borne animal diseases.

== Taxonomy ==
The eastern cattle egret under the name "Crabier de la Côte de Coromandel" was illustrated in a hand-coloured plate engraved by François-Nicolas Martinet in the Planches Enluminées D'Histoire Naturelle which was produced under the supervision of Edme-Louis Daubenton. The plate caption did not include a scientific name but in 1783 the Dutch naturalist Pieter Boddaert coined the binomial name Cancroma coromanda in his catalogue of the Planches Enluminées. The eastern cattle egret was formerly treated as a subspecies of the western cattle egret with the name "cattle egret" for the combined species. The eastern cattle egret was previously placed with the western cattle egret in the genus Bubulcus but both were moved to the genus Ardea when a molecular phylogenetic study published in 2023 that found they were embedded with members of this genus. The genus name Ardea is the Latin word for a "heron".

== Description ==
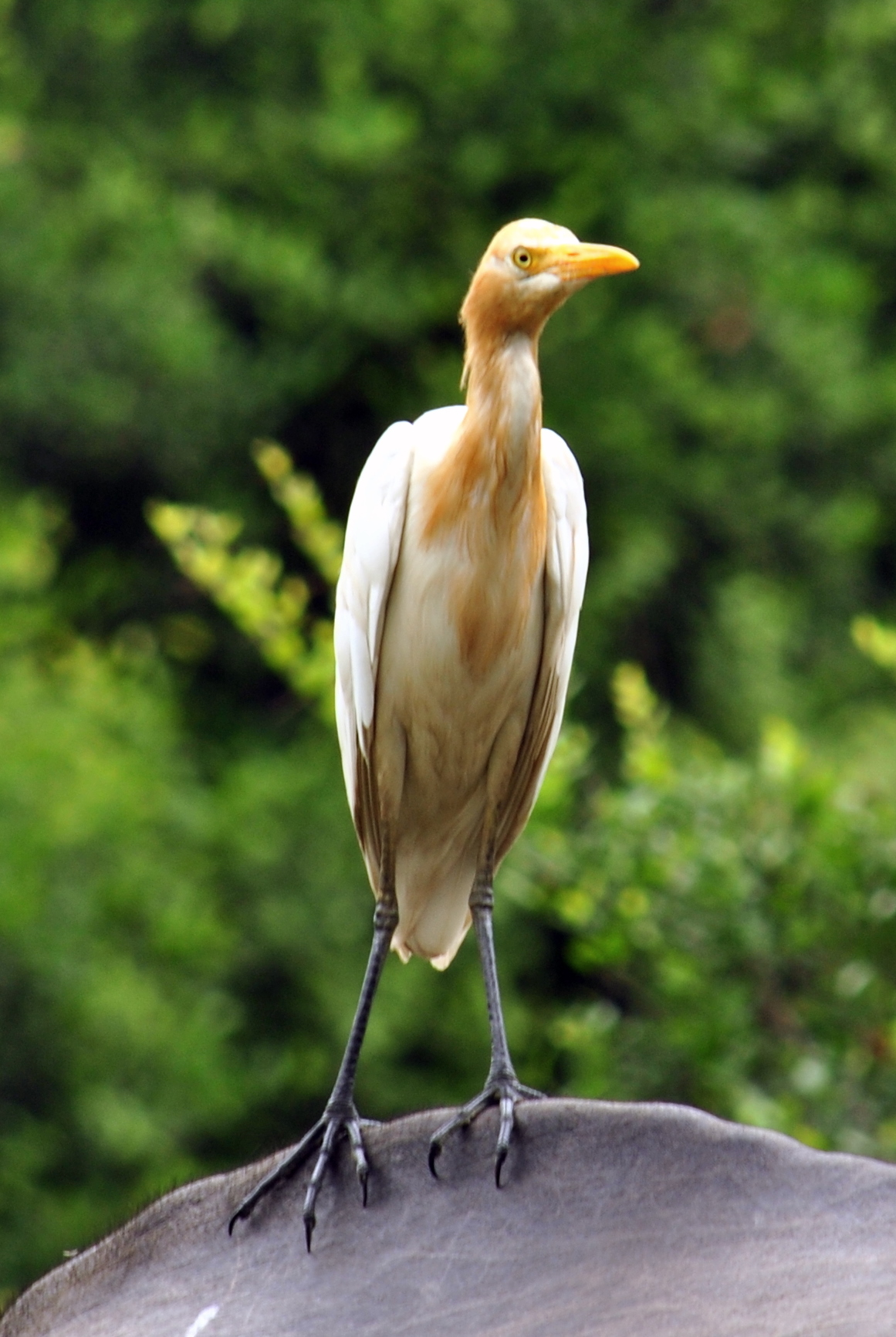
Perched on a buffalo in Asola Bhatti Wildlife Sanctuary in National Capital Region of Delhi, India.

The cattle egret is a stocky heron with an 88–96 cm (35–38 in) wingspan; it is 46–56 cm (18–22 in) long and weighs 270–512 g (9.5–18.1 oz). It has a relatively short thick neck, a sturdy bill, and a hunched posture. The non-breeding adult has mainly white plumage, a yellow bill and greyish-yellow legs. In the breeding season the adults have orange-buff plumes on the throat, head and lower back.

The eastern cattle egret differs from the western species in breeding plumage, when the buff colour on its head extends to the cheeks and throat, and the plumes are more golden in colour. The bill and tarsus are longer on average.

The positioning of the egret's eyes allows for binocular vision during feeding, and physiological studies suggest that they may be capable of crepuscular or nocturnal activity. Adapted to foraging on land, they have lost the ability possessed by their wetland relatives to accurately correct for light refraction by water.

This species gives a quiet, throaty rick-rack call at the breeding colony, but is otherwise largely silent.

== Distribution and habitat ==
In Australia, colonisation began in the 1940s, with the species establishing itself in the north and east of the continent. It began to regularly visit New Zealand in the 1960s.

The expansion of the eastern cattle egret's range is due to its relationship with humans and their domesticated animals. Originally adapted to a commensal relationship with large grazing and browsing animals, it was easily able to switch to domesticated cattle and horses. As the keeping of livestock spread throughout the world, the cattle egret was able to occupy otherwise empty niches. Many populations of cattle egrets are highly migratory and dispersive, and this has helped the species' range expansion.

Although the cattle egret sometimes feeds in shallow water, unlike most herons it is typically found in fields and dry grassy habitats, reflecting its greater dietary reliance on terrestrial insects rather than aquatic prey.

== Migration and movements ==
Some populations of cattle egrets are migratory, others are dispersive, and distinguishing between the two can be difficult for this species. In many areas populations can be both sedentary and migratory. In the northern hemisphere, migration is from cooler climes to warmer areas, but cattle egrets nesting in Australia migrate to cooler Tasmania and New Zealand in the winter and return in the spring. Populations in southern India appear to show local migrations in response to the monsoons. They move north from Kerala after September. During winter, many birds have been seen flying at night with flocks of Indian pond herons (Ardeola grayii) on the south-eastern coast of India, and a winter influx has also been noted in Sri Lanka.

== Breeding ==
The eastern cattle egret nests in colonies, which are often, but not always, found around bodies of water. The colonies are usually found in woodlands near lakes or rivers, in swamps, or on small inland or coastal islands, and are sometimes shared with other wetland birds, such as herons, egrets, ibises and cormorants. The breeding season varies within South Asia. Nesting in northern India begins with the onset of monsoons in May. The breeding season in Australia is November to early January, with one brood laid per season.

The male displays in a tree in the colony, using a range of ritualised behaviours such as shaking a twig and sky-pointing (raising his bill vertically upwards), and the pair forms over three or four days. A new mate is chosen in each season and when re-nesting following nest failure. The nest is a small untidy platform of sticks in a tree or shrub constructed by both parents. Sticks are collected by the male and arranged by the female, and stick-stealing is rife. The clutch size can be anywhere from two to seven eggs, although three or four is most common. The pale greenish-white eggs are oval-shaped and measure 45 mm × 33 mm (1.8 in × 1.3 in). Incubation lasts around 24 days, with both sexes sharing incubation duties. The chicks are brooded by both parents and are not capable of fending for themselves. They are fed by regurgitation by both parents. and are fully feathered in 21 days. They begin to leave the nest and climb around at 2 weeks but cannot fly until they are six weeks old. After fledging they return to the nest to be fed for another couple of weeks.

In Australia, Torresian crows, wedge-tailed eagles and white-bellied sea eagles take eggs or young, and tick infestation and viral infections may also be causes of mortality.

== Feeding ==
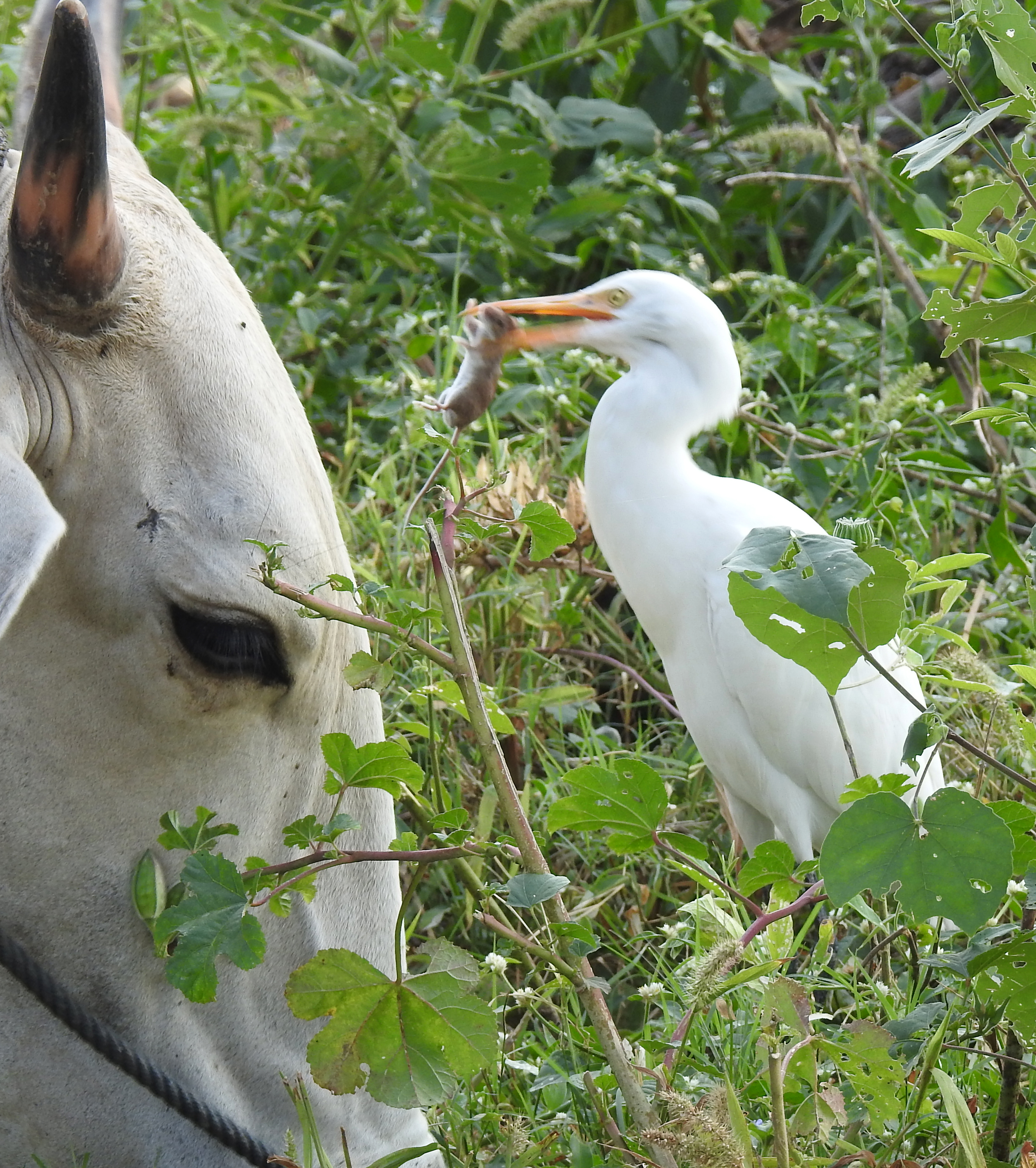
With a mouse, caught after being disturbed by a cow. The bird is in winter plumage.

The cattle egret feeds on a wide range of prey, particularly insects, especially grasshoppers, crickets, flies (adults and maggots), and moths, as well as spiders, frogs, and earthworms. In a rare instance they have been observed foraging along the branches of a banyan tree for ripe figs. The species is usually found with cattle and other large grazing and browsing animals, and catches small creatures disturbed by the mammals. Studies have shown that cattle egret foraging success is much higher when foraging near a large animal than when feeding singly. When foraging with cattle, it has been shown to be 3.6 times more successful in capturing prey than when foraging alone. Its performance is similar when it follows farm machinery, but it is forced to move more. In urban situations cattle egrets have also been observed foraging in peculiar situations like railway lines.

A cattle egret will weakly defend the area around a grazing animal against others of the same species, but if the area is swamped by egrets it will give up and continue foraging elsewhere. Where numerous large animals are present, cattle egrets selectively forage around species that move at around 5–15 steps per minute, avoiding faster and slower moving herds.

The cattle egret may also show versatility in its diet. On islands with seabird colonies, it will prey on the eggs and chicks of terns and other seabirds. During migration it has also been reported to eat exhausted migrating landbirds.

== Relationship with humans ==
A conspicuous species, the cattle egret has attracted many common names. These mostly relate to its habit of following cattle and other large animals.

The cattle egret is a popular bird with cattle ranchers for its perceived role as a biocontrol of cattle parasites such as ticks and flies. A study in Australia found that cattle egrets reduced the number of flies that bothered cattle by pecking them directly off the skin.

Not all interactions between humans and eastern cattle egrets are beneficial. The cattle egret can be a safety hazard to aircraft due to its habit of feeding in large groups in the grassy verges of airports, and it has been implicated in the spread of animal infections such as heartwater, infectious bursal disease and possibly Newcastle disease.

== Sources ==
- Marchant, S.; Higgins, P.G., eds. (1990). "Ardea ibis Cattle Egret". Handbook of Australian, New Zealand & Antarctic Birds. Volume 1: Ratites to ducks; Part B, Australian pelican to ducks. Melbourne, Victoria: Oxford University Press. pp. 1017–1028. ISBN 978-0-19-553068-1.
