= Jacutinga, Minas Gerais =

Municipality in the state of Minas Gerais in Brazil

Coordinates: 22°17′09″S 46°36′43″W

- Municipality
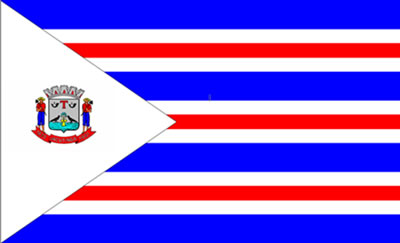
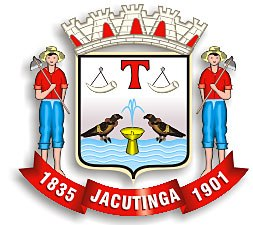
- Flag Coat of arms
- Interactive map of Jacutinga, Minas Gerais
- Country: Brazil
- State: Minas Gerais
- Region: Southeast
- Time zone: UTC−3 (BRT)

Map showing location of Jacutinga in red.

Jacutinga is a Brazilian municipality in the state of Minas Gerais. As of 2020, the estimated population was 26,264.

== Other uses ==
Jacutinga is also a type of gold-bearing iron ore found in Brazil.

== See also ==
- List of municipalities in Minas Gerais
