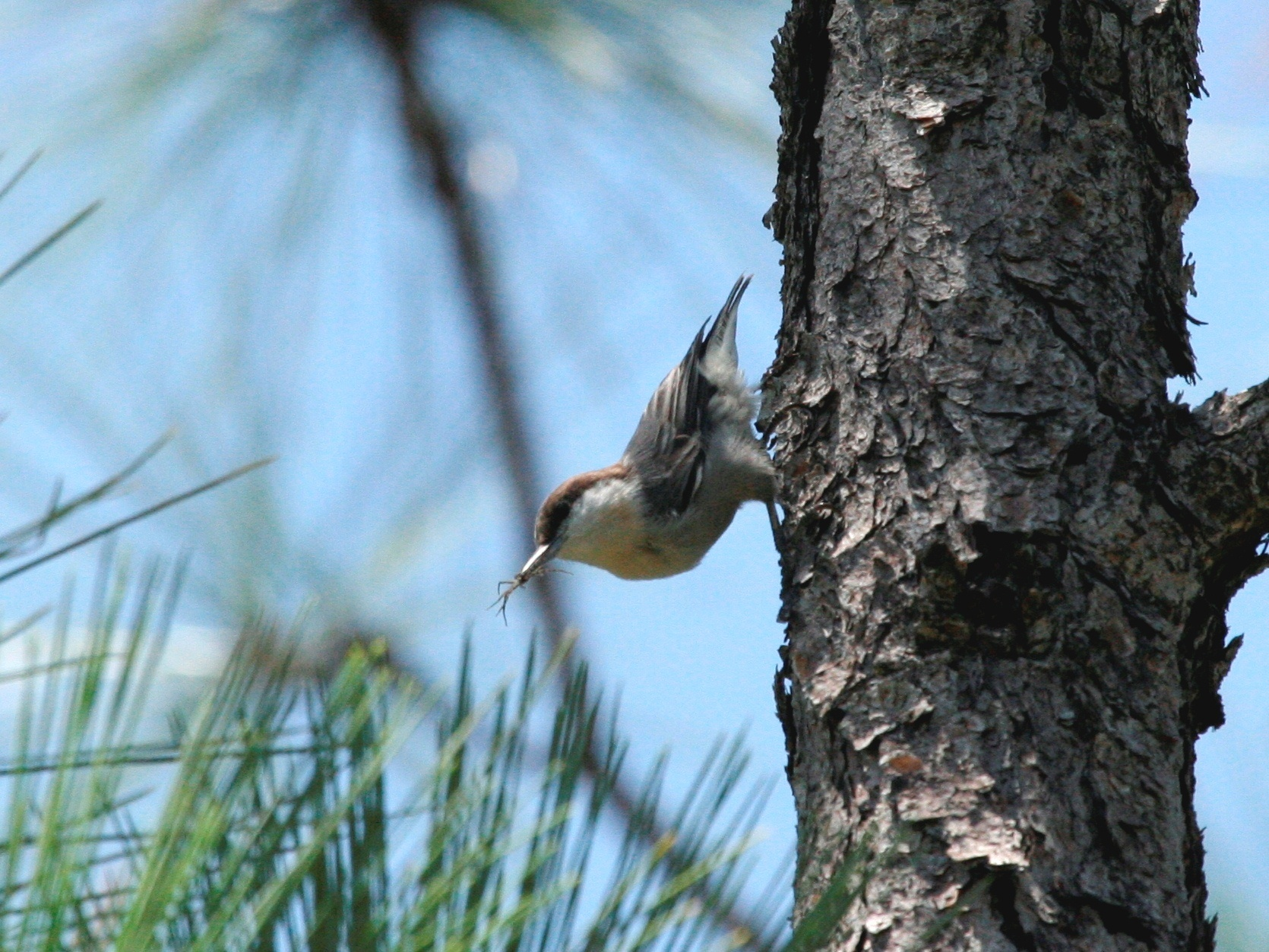

Conservation status
- Critically Endangered (IUCN 3.1)

Scientific classification
- Kingdom: Animalia
- Phylum: Chordata
- Class: Aves
- Order: Passeriformes
- Family: Sittidae
- Genus: Sitta
- Species: S. insularis

Binomial name
- Sitta insularis Bond, 1931

Synonyms
- Sitta pusilla insularis

= Bahama nuthatch =

Potentially extinct species of bird

The Bahama nuthatch (Sitta insularis) is a nuthatch species endemic to the pineyards of Grand Bahama island in the Bahamas. It may be extinct as of 2019.

== Description ==
It has some notable differences from its closest relative, the brown-headed nuthatch (S. pusilla), including a darker brown facial stripe, a longer bill, shorter wings, and a unique warbling call.

== Taxonomy ==
It was previously considered a subspecies of the brown-headed nuthatch by most taxonomic authorities. A 2020 study found further evidence for it being a distinct species, finding significant vocal differences based on voice recordings and a notable genetic difference from the brown-headed nuthatch that was even larger than that of some birds unanimously considered distinct species from their mainland relatives, such as the Bahama warbler (Setophaga flavescens) compared the yellow-throated warbler (S. dominica). The International Ornithological Congress has since reclassified it as a distinct species.

Some previous studies considered it a subspecies of S. pusilla based on the fact that the species was only ever historically known from Grand Bahama, which only separated from the Abacos about 2,500 years ago, which would indicate they only ever colonized Grand Bahama and was too recent for total speciation to occur. However, later research using genetic markers indicates that both species likely diverged around 685,000 years ago and late Pleistocene fossil remains of S. insularis from Abaco and Long Island have since been described, indicating that it likely had a much wider distribution across the Bahamas until for unknown reasons, it was restricted to Grand Bahama by the Holocene.

== Threats and population decline ==
It is officially considered critically endangered and is very likely extinct. Due to its very restricted range, it is highly threatened by habitat destruction and degradation, fires, and hurricane damage. Invasive species such as the corn snake (Pantherophis guttatus), raccoon (Procyon lotor), house sparrows (Passer domesticus) and common starlings (Sturnus vulgaris) may have also played a role in its decline. Almost all of the pine forest on Grand Bahama was logged in the 1950s but portions have since regenerated, and the species was reported as locally common in surveys in 1969 and 1978. However, only 2 individuals were detected in extensive 1993 surveys, indicating that the nuthatch had since massively declined for unknown reasons. All observations since the 2000s have been in or around a patch of private land known as Lucaya Estates. A 2004 estimated that 1,800 individuals existed, but it was admitted by the authors that this was an overly optimistic number, and a 2007 survey only found about 23 individuals. Grand Bahama was hit by Hurricane Matthew in 2016, causing significant damage, and monthly surveys by a local bird guide and 4 days of intensive surveys in January 2018 failed to find any birds, leading to fears that the bird was extinct until extensive surveys in the spring and summer of 2018, which resulted in a small number of sightings, including one in which two birds were found.

=== Possible extinction ===
The destructive effects of Hurricane Dorian in 2019 may have killed off the Bahama nuthatch population, especially the historically significant destruction and saltwater flooding of the pineyards from the lingering Category 5 storm. A post-hurricane press release by the American Bird Conservancy indicated that the area in which the birds were last seen still had standing pines but had experienced saltwater intrusion, which could kill the trees over a period of time, and supported further surveys to look for the nuthatch. However, it is unlikely that the birds withstood the 24-hour 295 km/h (180 mph) winds that the area experienced. A 2020 post-hurricane assessment by the IUCN Red List still entertains the probability of the species being extant, although likely having a maximum population size of only 50 individuals and likely well below that, and indicates that extensive surveys for the species will be needed to confirm its status.

== See also ==
- Cozumel thrasher, another endangered Caribbean bird that may have also been wiped out or reduced to critical levels following a devastating hurricane.
