= Potbelly =

Potbelly may refer to:

- Abdominal obesity, commonly known as a pot belly, deposits of body fat localised around the abdomen
- Potbelly stove, a type of cast-iron wood-burning stove
- Potbelly Sandwich Shop
- Potbelly sculpture, a type of ancient monument found in southern Mesoamerica
- Ptolemy VIII Physcon, king of Egypt c. 182 BC – 116 BC
- Göbekli Tepe, Turkish for "Potbelly Hill"
- Tillandsia paucifolia, or the Potbelly airplant

Potbellied may also refer to:

- Vietnamese Pot-bellied, a breed of domesticated pig originating in Vietnam
- Pot-bellied seahorse

== See also ==
- Kettlebelly (disambiguation)
