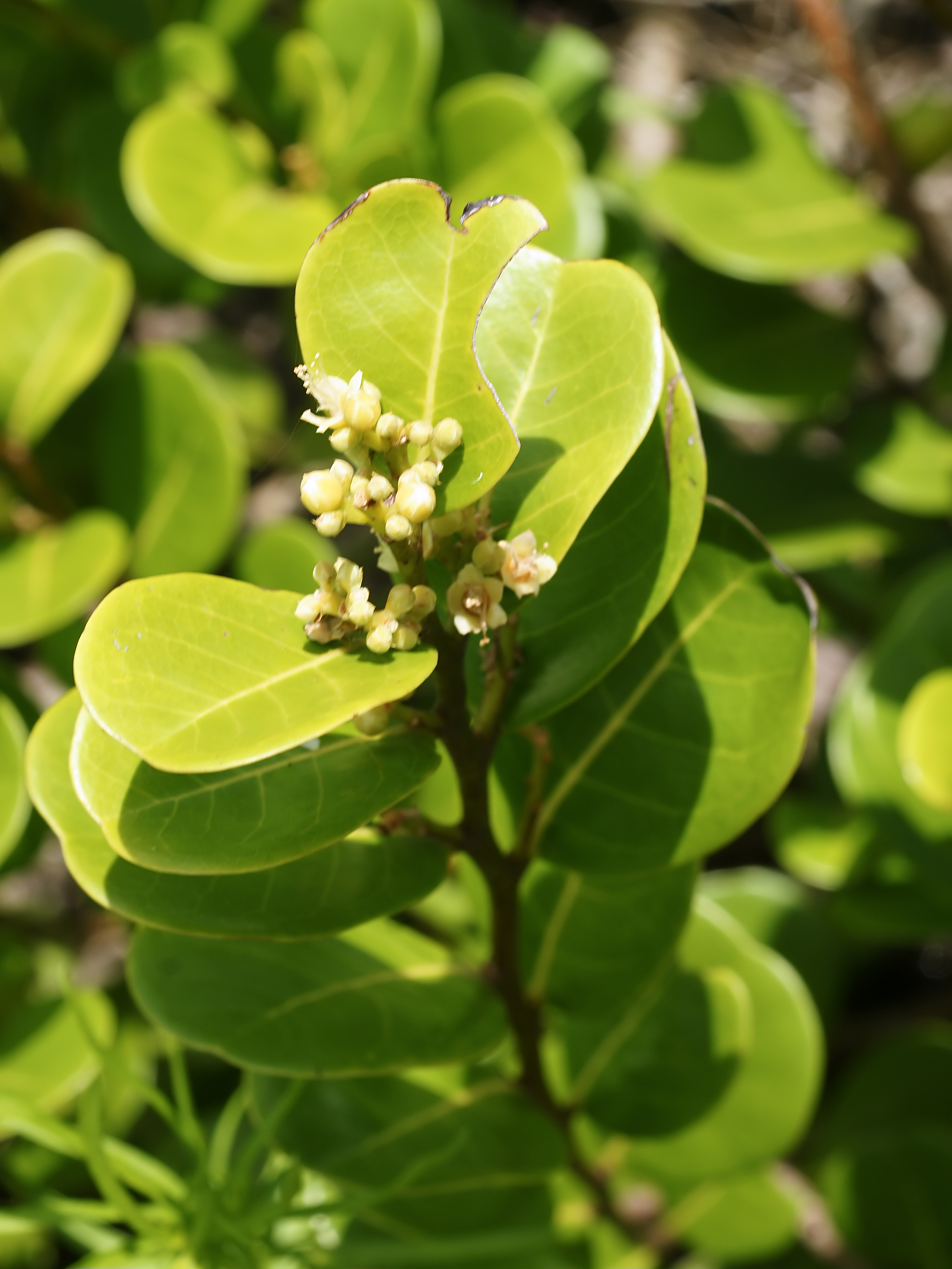
- Chrysobalanus icaco leaves and flowers

Conservation status
- Least Concern (IUCN 3.1)

- Secure (NatureServe)

Scientific classification
- Kingdom: Plantae
- Clade: Tracheophytes
- Clade: Angiosperms
- Clade: Eudicots
- Clade: Rosids
- Order: Malpighiales
- Family: Chrysobalanaceae
- Genus: Chrysobalanus
- Species: C. icaco

Binomial name
- Chrysobalanus icaco (L.) L.
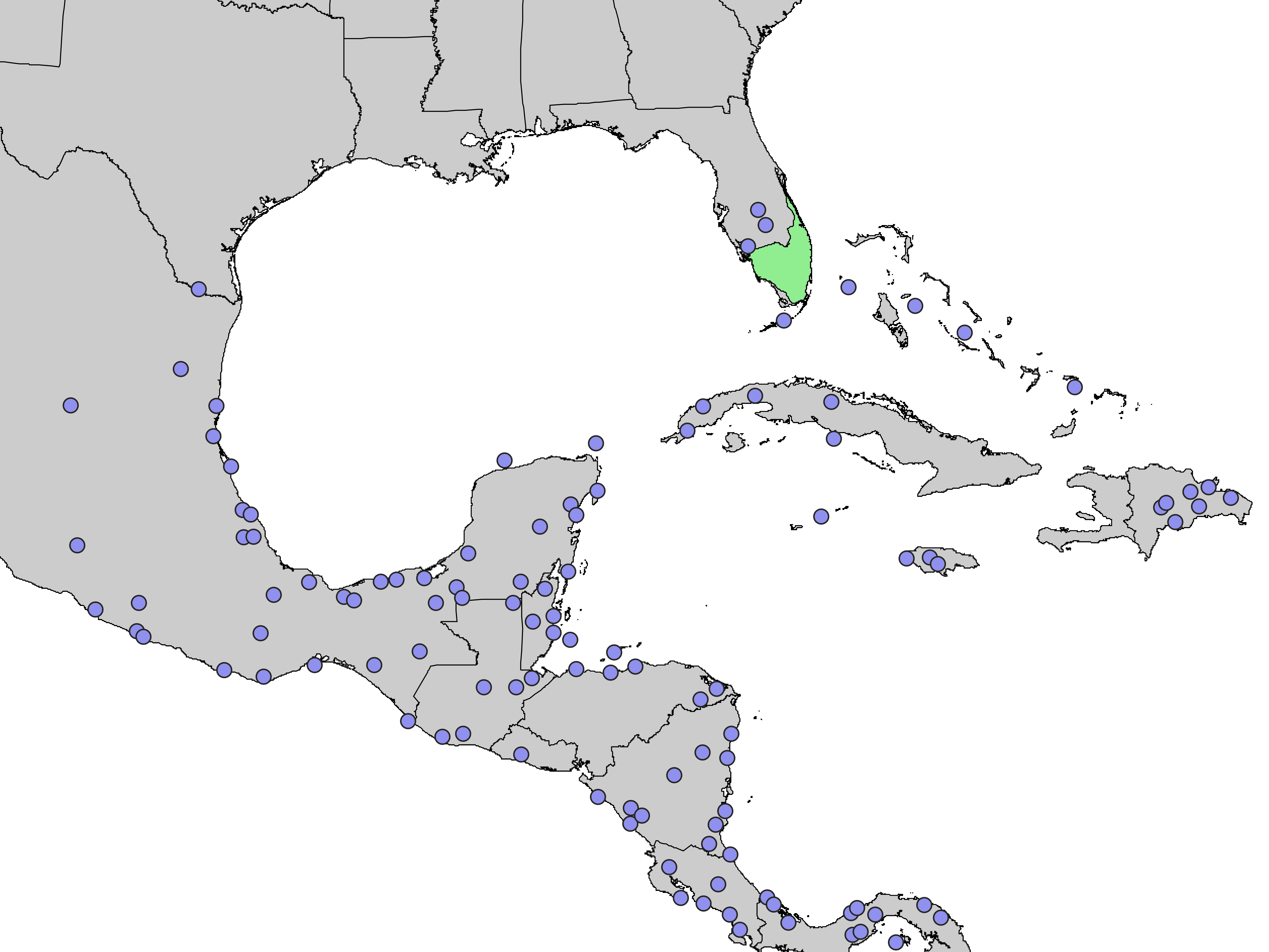
- Distribution

Synonyms
- Chrysobalanus atacorensis A.Chev.; Chrysobalanus chariensis A.Chev.; Maba sudanensis A.Chev.; Chrysobalanus purpureus Mill.; Chrysobalanus pellocarpus G.Mey.; Chrysobalanus ellipticus Sol. ex Sabine; Chrysobalanus luteus Sabine; Chrysobalanus orbicularis Schumach.; Chrysobalanus guianensis Klotzsch; Chrysobalanus stuhlmannii Engl.; Chrysobalanus savannarum Britton; Chrysobalanus interior Small; Prunus icaco Labat

= Chrysobalanus icaco =

Species of tree

Chrysobalanus icaco, the cocoplum, paradise plum, abajeru or icaco is a low shrub or bushy tree found near sea beaches and inland throughout tropical Africa, tropical Americas and the Caribbean, and in southern Florida and the Bahamas. An evergreen, it is also found as an exotic species on other tropical islands, where it has become a problematic invasive. Although taxonomists disagree on whether Chrysobalanus icaco has multiple subspecies or varieties, it is recognized as having two ecotypes, described as an inland, much less salt-tolerant, and more upright C. icaco var. pellocarpus and a coastal C. icaco var. icaco. Both the ripe fruit of C. icaco, and the seed inside the ridged shell it contains, are considered edible.

== Description ==
Chrysobalanus icaco is a shrub 1–3 metres (3.3–9.8 ft), or bushy tree 2–6 metres (6.6–19.7 ft), rarely to 10 metres (33 ft). It has evergreen broad-oval to nearly round somewhat leathery leaves (3 to 10 cm (1.2 to 3.9 in) long and 2.5 to 7 cm (0.98 to 2.76 in) wide). Leaf colors range from green to light red. The bark is greyish or reddish brown, with white specks.

The clustered flowers are small, greenish-white, and appear intermittently throughout the year but more abundantly in late spring. The fruit that follows (a drupe) is variable, with that of the coastal form being round, up to 5 cm (2.0 in) in diameter, white, pale-yellow with a rose blush or dark-purple in color, while that of the inland form is oval, up to 2.5 cm (0.98 in) long, and dark-purple. The fruit is edible, with an almost tasteless to mildly sweet flavor, and is sometimes used for jam. It contains a five- or six-ridged brown stone with an edible white seed. The common name for this fruit in Dominica, Barbados, Trinidad and Tobago, Guyana, and other Caribbean islands is "fat pork". The seed's kernel is used ground into a powder and dried, as a spice (variously called gbafilo, itsekiri, umilo,emilo or omilo) as part of West African Pepper Soup Mix.

Chrysobalanus icaco is unable to survive a hard frost, but is planted as an ornamental shrub in subtropical regions due to its appearance, easily manageable size, and tolerance of shallow and variable soils (for example, as alkaline as pH 8.4) and partial shade. Several cultivars are available:

- 'Red Tip' is of the inland ecotype, and is the most commonly planted in Florida, often as a hedge. It is a chance occurrence that has pink new growth.
- 'Green Tip' is another example of the inland type that has green new growth.
- 'Horizontal' is of the coastal type, and tends to root wherever its creeping branches touch the ground, creating clumps over time that can help stabilize the soil. Combined with the high salt tolerance of the coastal ecotype, this characteristic means it can be planted to stabilize beach edges and prevent erosion.

Chrysobalanus icaco plays a role in traditional medicine in some parts of its native range, and has been the subject of scientific investigations that have provided evidence of hypoglycemic, antioxidant, antifungal and other pharmacological properties of the leaf extract.

== Gallery ==
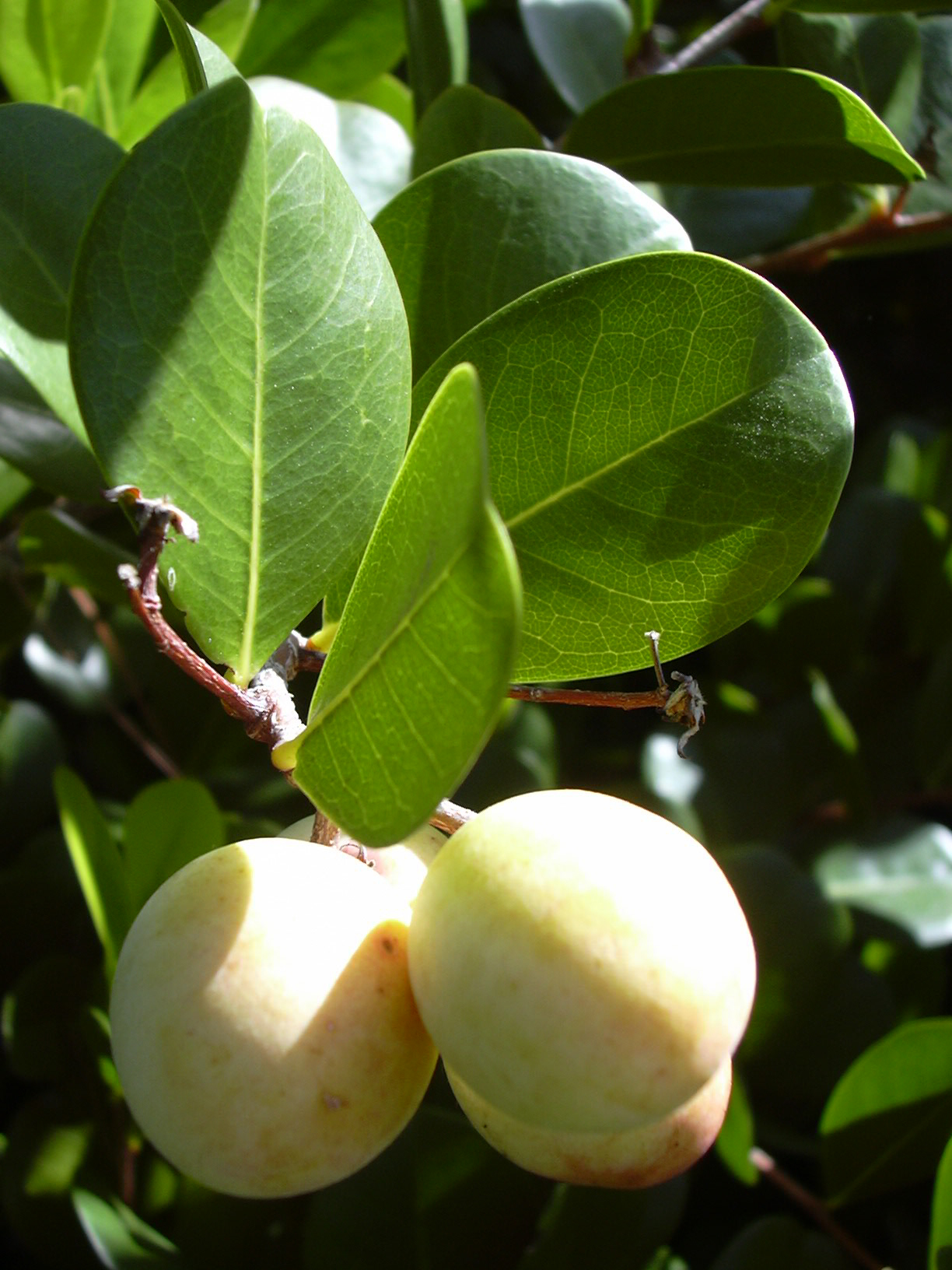
Fruit of the coastal form

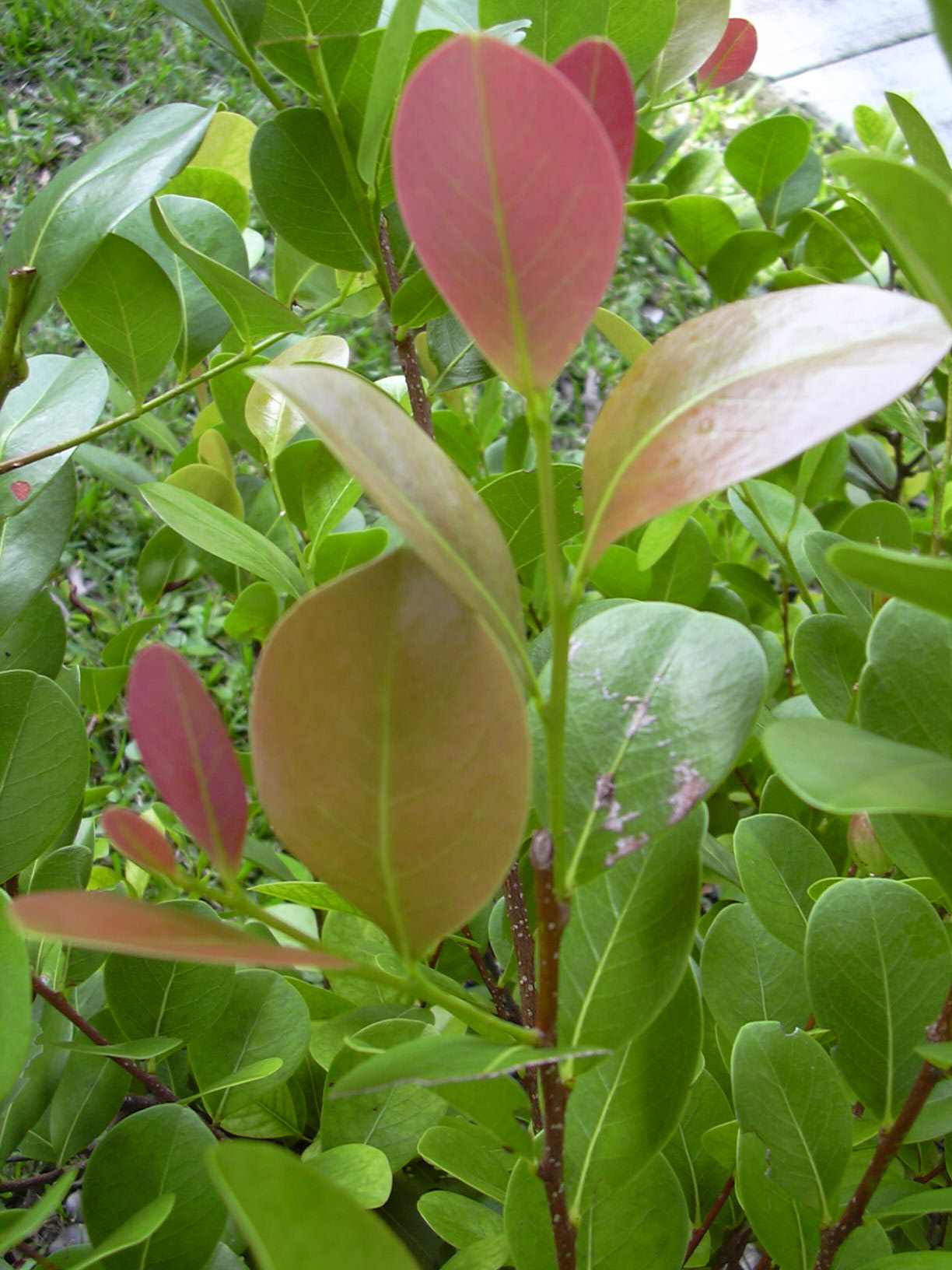
Red leaves on the inland form

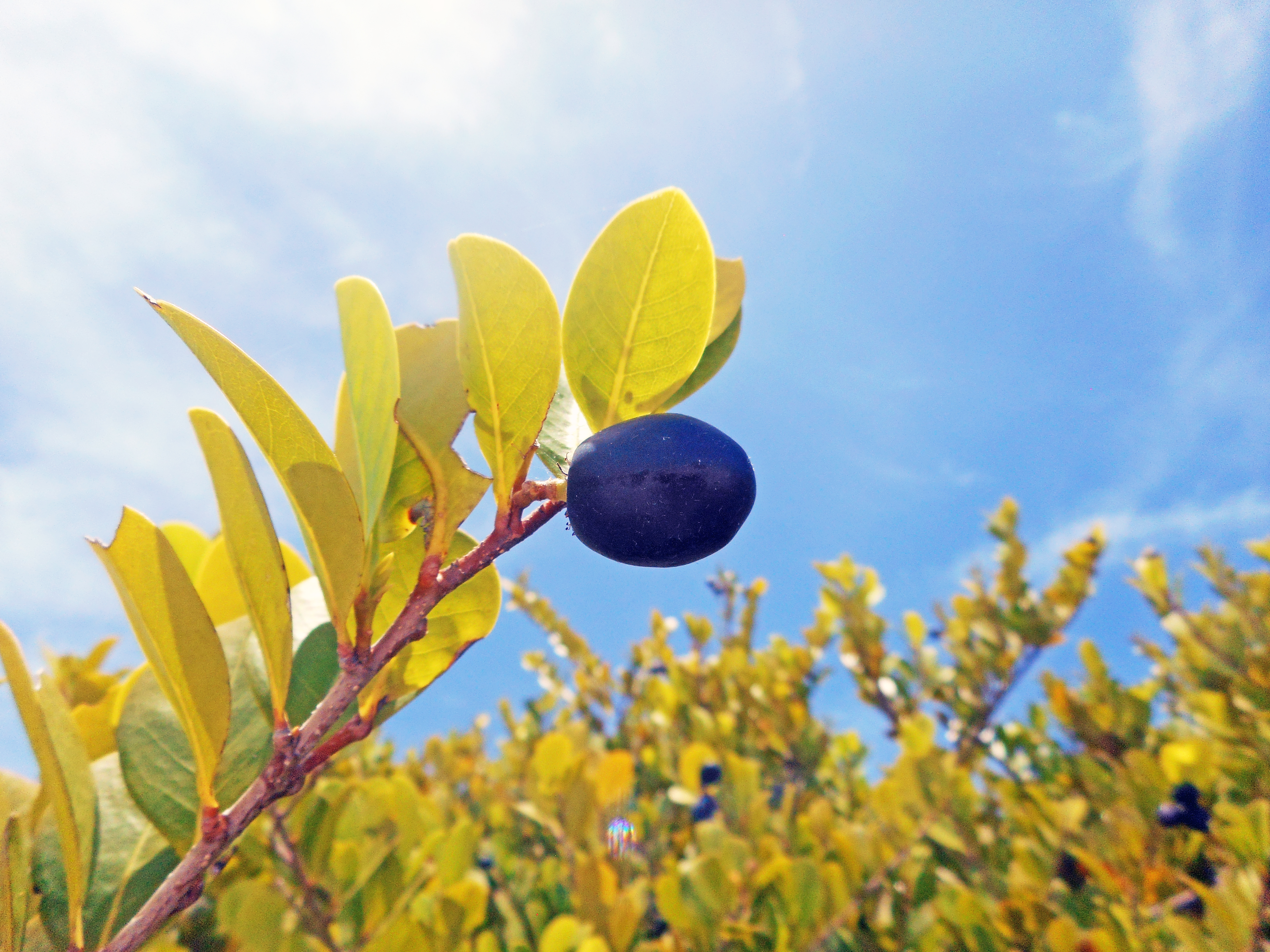
Fruit and branches of cocoplum growing in Oleta River State Park on Biscayne Bay in North Miami, Florida -

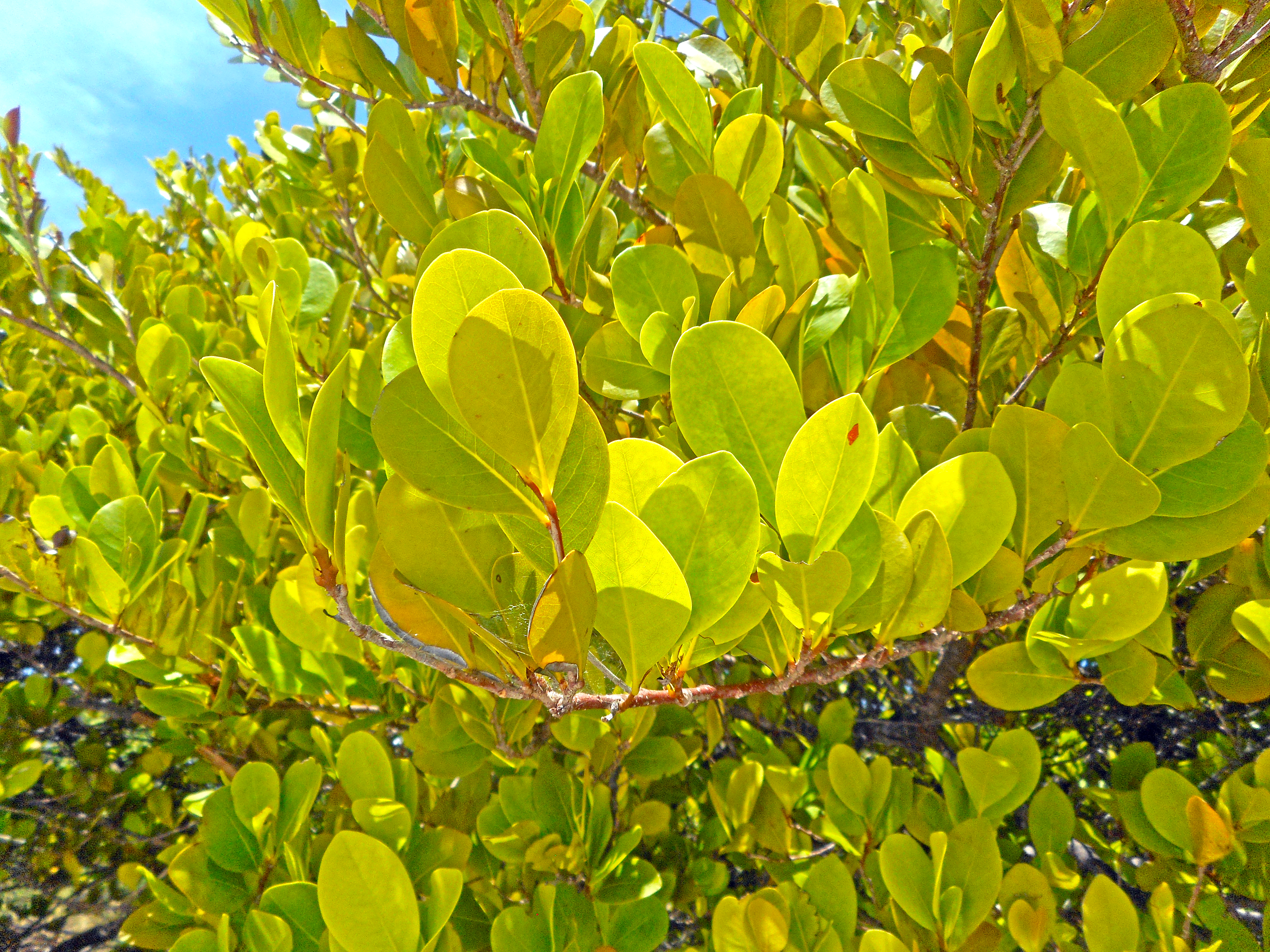
Detail of branches

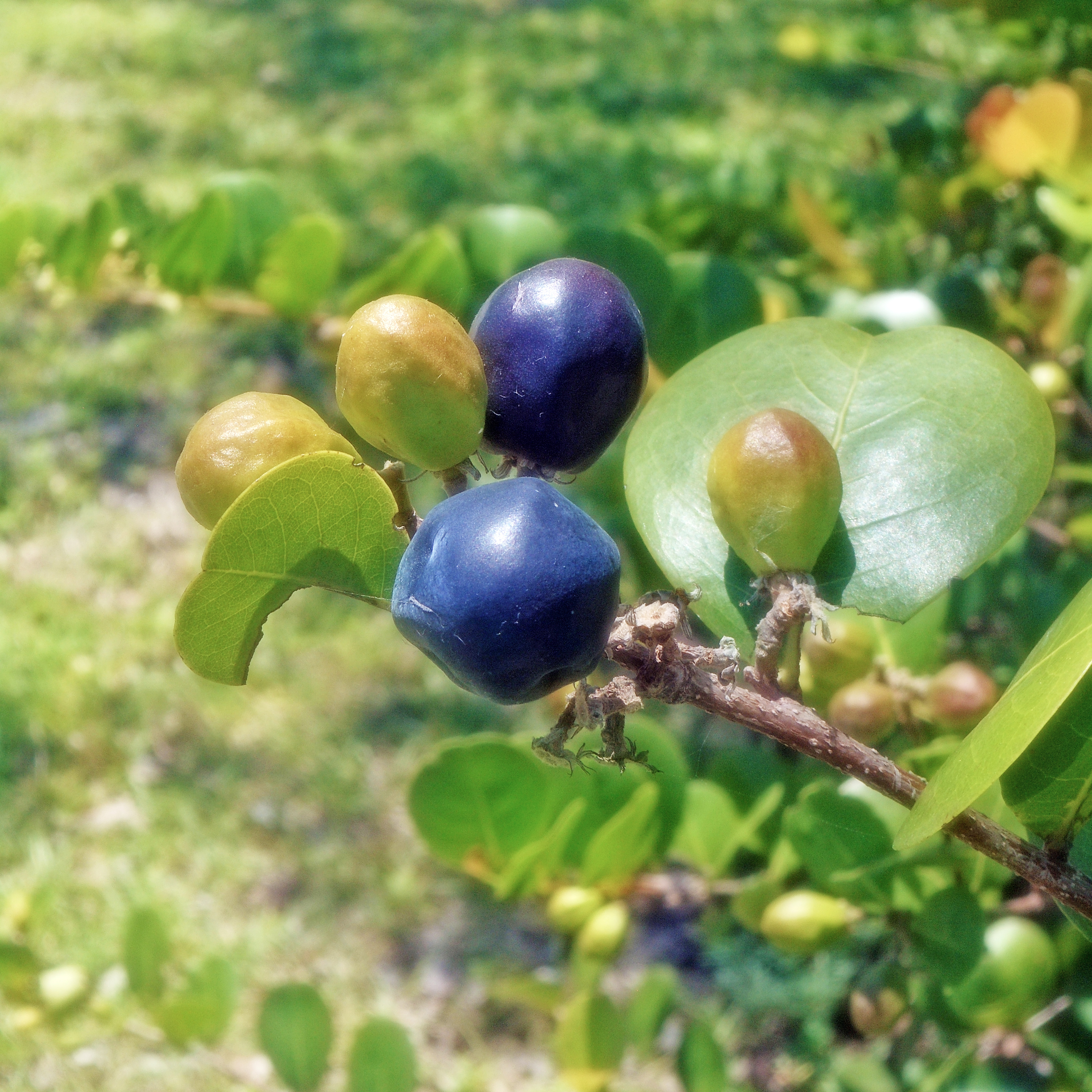
Mature and immature fruits

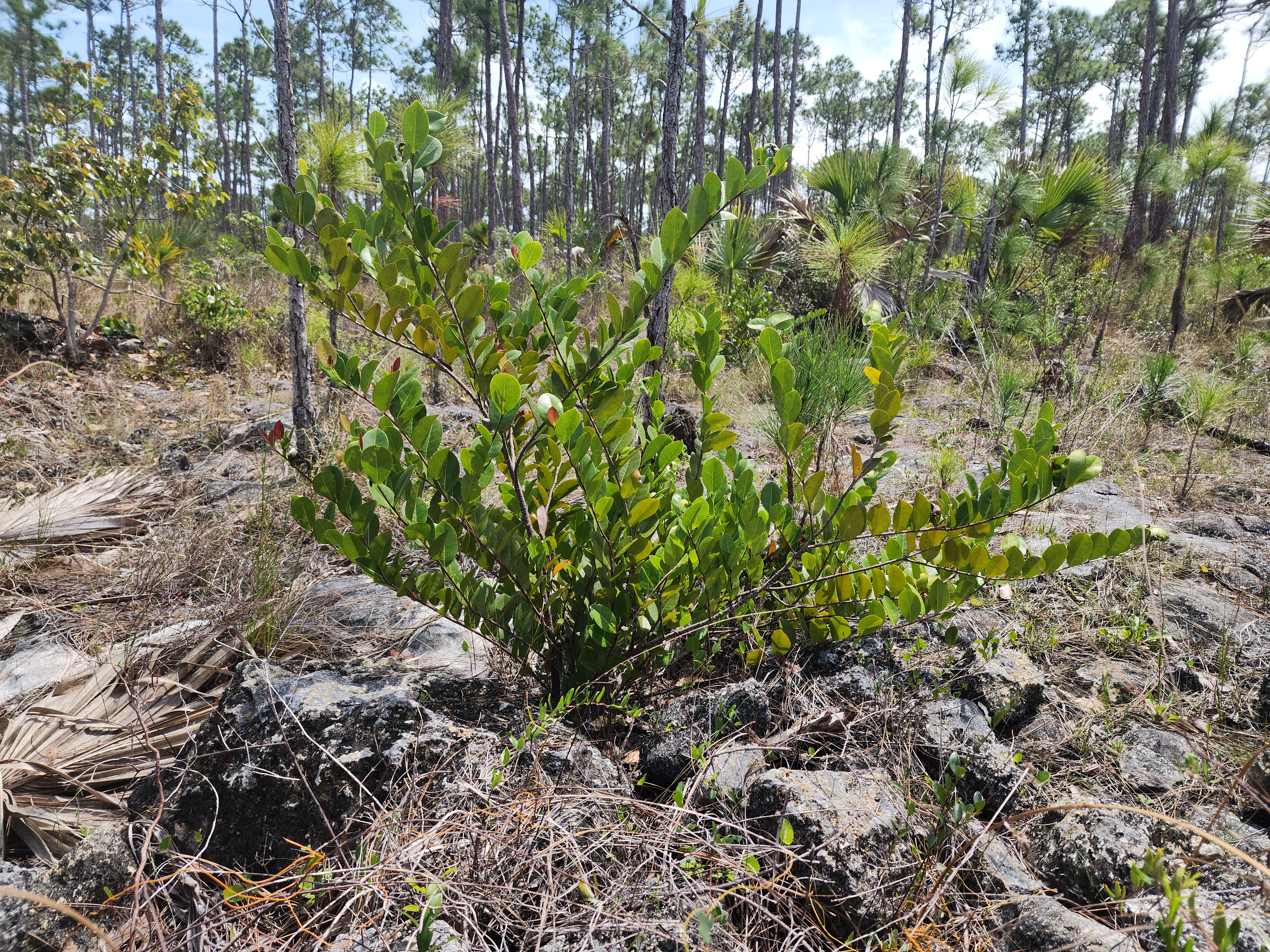
In seasonally wet pineyard, Abaco National Park
