= Bahamian dry forests =

Ecoregion in the Bahamas and Turks and Caicos Islands

Ecology
- Realm: Neotropical
- Biome: tropical and subtropical dry broadleaf forests
- Borders: Bahamian pineyards; Greater Antilles mangroves

Geography
- Area: 4,900 km^{2} (1,900 sq mi)
- Countries: Bahamas; Turks and Caicos Islands (United Kingdom)

Conservation
- Conservation status: Critical/endangered

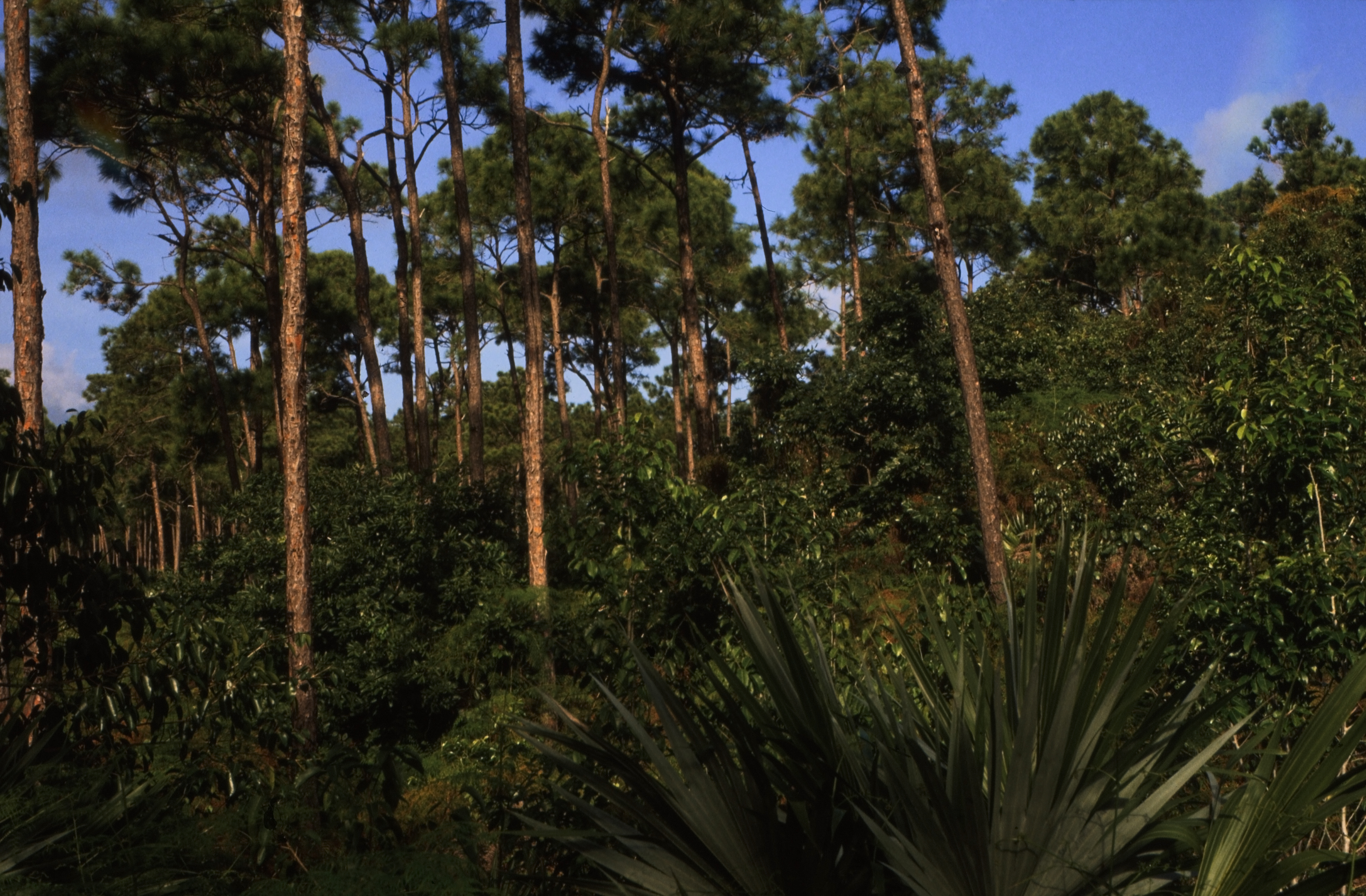
Bahamian pine forest

The Bahamian dry forests are a tropical and subtropical dry broadleaf forest ecoregion in the Bahamas and the Turks and Caicos Islands, covering an area of 4,900 km^{2} (1,900 sq mi). They are found on much of the northern Bahamas, including Andros, Abaco, and Grand Bahama, where they are known as coppices. Dry forests are distributed evenly throughout the Turks and Caicos.

== Whiteland coppice ==
Whiteland coppices are shrubby forests that occur near the ocean. Vegetation occurring in whiteland coppice is able to withstand salt spray and rocky, calcareous soil. Trees that grow in whiteland coppices include cinnecord (Acacia choriophylla), brasiletto (Caesalpinia vesicaria), haulback tree (Mimosa bahamensis), autograph tree (Clusia rosea), manchineel tree (Hippomane mancinella), West Indian mahogany (Swietenia mahagoni), sea grape (Coccoloba uvifera), gumbo-limbo (Bursera simaruba), cabbage palmetto (Sabal palmetto), and poisonwood (Metopium toxiferum). The understory features snake bark (Colubrina arborescens) as well as cacti such as erect prickly pear (Opuntia stricta), Turk's cap cactus (Melocactus intortus), queen of the night (Selenicereus grandiflorus), and robin tree cactus (Pilosocereus polygonus).

== Blackland coppice ==
Blackland coppice covers the interior of many of the islands, usually in elevated regions. For this reason some blackland coppice exists on hills entirely surrounded by forests of Caribbean pine (Pinus caribaea var. bahamensis). Trees found within them include West Indian mahogany (Swietenia mahagoni), wild tamarind (Lysiloma latisiliquum), red cedar (Cedrela odorata), false mastic (Sideroxylon foetidissimum), horseflesh (Lysiloma sabicu), pigeon plum (Coccoloba diversifolia), Jamaican dogwood (Piscidia piscipula), gumbo-limbo (Bursera simaruba), and lancewood (Nectandra coriacea). Shaded by the canopy, plants such as satin leaf (Chrysophyllum oliviforme), Spanish stopper (Eugenia foetida), Bahama wild coffee (Psychotria ligustrifolia), Bahama strongbark (Bourreria succulenta), night-scented orchid (Epidendrum nocturnum), wormvine orchid (Vanilla barbellata), and potbelly airplant (Tillandsia paucifolia) grow in the understory.

== Rocky coppice ==
Rocky coppice occurs on limestone outcroppings between mangroves and pineyards. These forests are often flooded at high tide. They are dominated by spiny black olive (Bucida molinetii), but Swietenia mahagoni and Cedrela odorata also grow within them.

== Fauna ==
Fauna that reside within Bahamian dry forests includes the Bahaman funnel-eared bat (Natalus tumidifrons), rock iguanas (Cyclura spp.), the Bahamian hutia (Geocapromys ingrahami), and the Cuban amazon (Amazona leucocephala bahamensis).

== See also ==
- Bahamian pineyards
- South Florida rocklands
