= Kettlebelly =

Kettlebelly or Kettle Belly may refer to:

- Gregory "Kettle Belly" Baldwin, a fictional character used by Robert Heinlein in some of his stories, including Gulf
- Kettle Belly, a character in the 1931 western Two Gun Man
- 'Kettle Belly' Simpson, a character in the 1927 film Somewhere in Sonora

== See also ==
- Kettlebell, a cast iron or cast steel ball with a handle attached to the top
- Potbelly (disambiguation)
