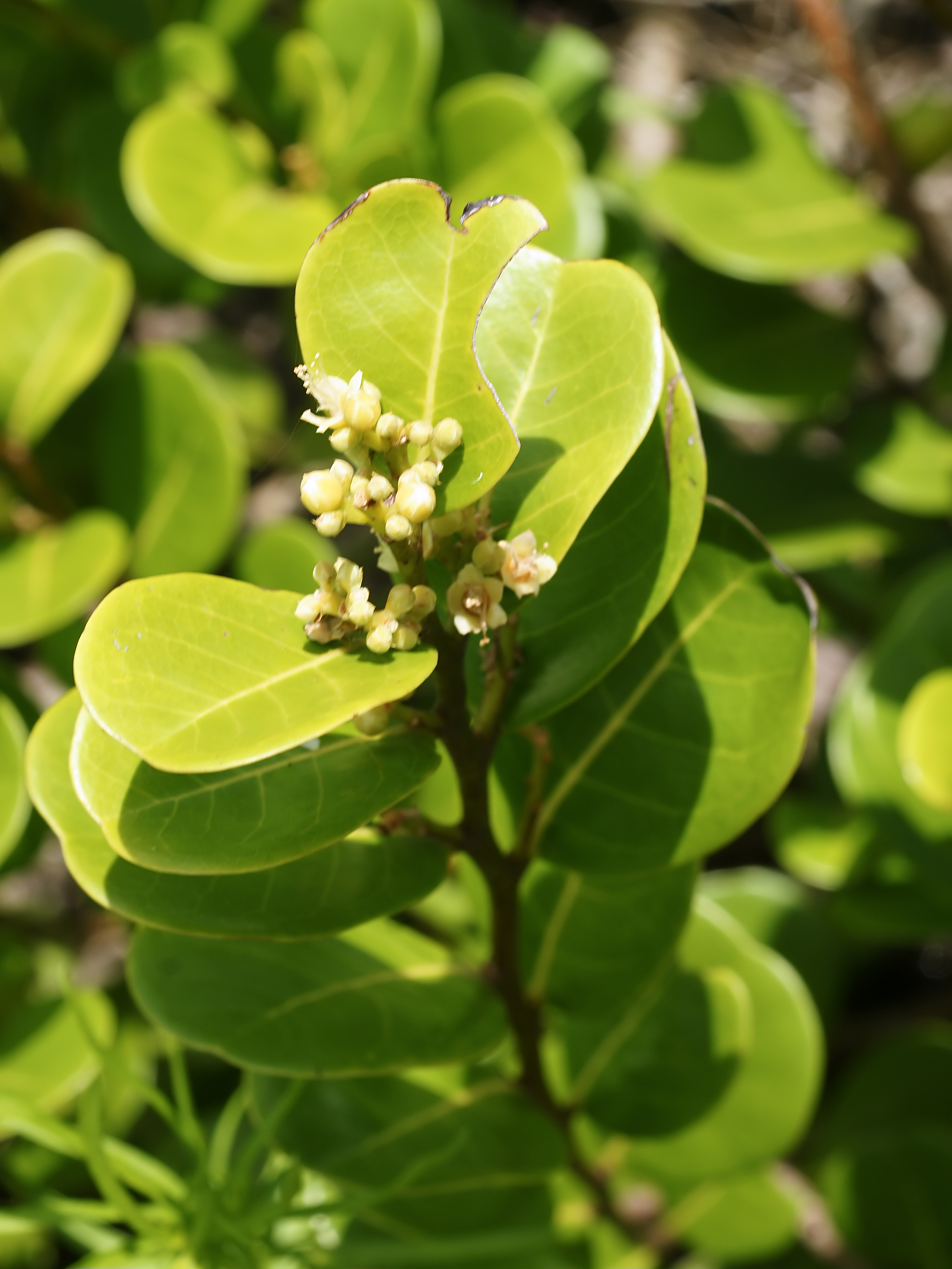
- Chrysobalanus icaco

Scientific classification
- Kingdom: Plantae
- Clade: Tracheophytes
- Clade: Angiosperms
- Clade: Eudicots
- Clade: Rosids
- Order: Malpighiales
- Family: Chrysobalanaceae
- Genus: Chrysobalanus; L.

Synonyms
- Icaco Adans.

= Chrysobalanus =

Genus of perennial shrubs to small trees

Chrysobalanus is a genus of evergreen perennial shrubs to small trees, described as a genus by Linnaeus in 1753. It is native to sub-tropical and tropical regions of Africa, Latin America, and Florida.

Chrysobalanus attains a maximum height of 25 or 30 feet (8–10 m). It is found in coastal areas as a wild plant, and is frequently planted in gardens. It has a low-growing and sprawling habit. It can form dense stands and become invasive. The leaves are obovate or obcordate in outline, about 2in long, thick, glossy, and deep green in color. It has small white flowers, in axillary racemes or cymes, not too showy, but they have a dainty and sweet fragrance. This plant bears a damson-sized edible red pulpy fruit with a black and thin skin, resembles a large plum in appearance, being oval 1.5in long. The sweet fruits with white flesh adheres closely to the large oblong seed turn from creamy tones to dark-blue peaches which can be made into a sweet preserved jam, made by the earliest arrivals to the low-lying Florida peninsula. The fruit is extensively used in the tropics.

== Species ==
Species from Kew Monocot Checklist:

- Chrysobalanus cuspidatus Griseb. ex Duss - Lesser Antilles
- Chrysobalanus icaco L. (coco plum) - tropical Africa, Mexico, Central America, West Indies, northern South America, Florida
- Chrysobalanus venezuelanus G.T.Prance - SE Venezuela, N Brazil
