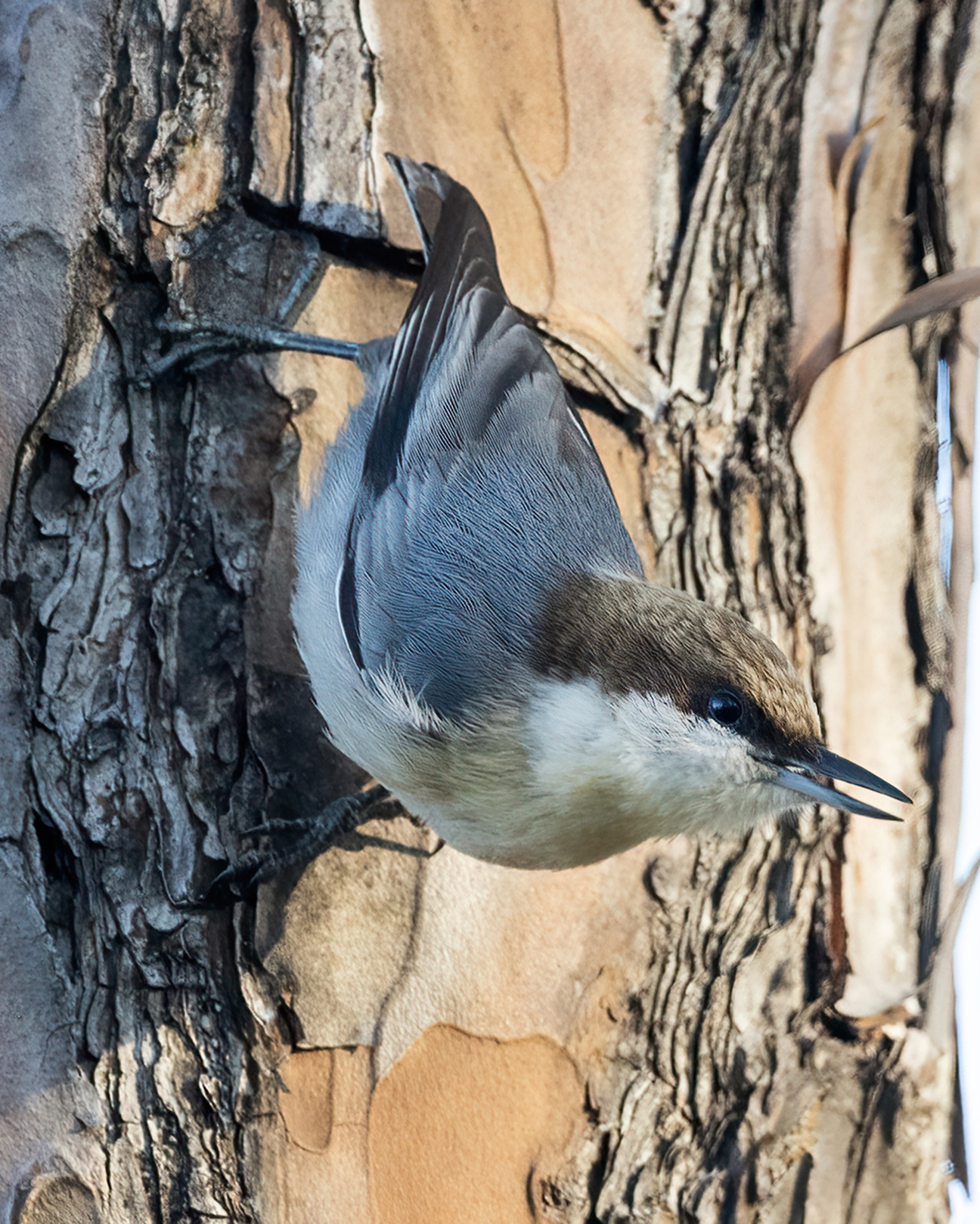
- In Florida, US

Conservation status
- Least Concern (IUCN 3.1)

Scientific classification
- Kingdom: Animalia
- Phylum: Chordata
- Class: Aves
- Order: Passeriformes
- Family: Sittidae
- Genus: Sitta
- Species: S. pusilla

Binomial name
- Sitta pusilla Latham, 1790

Subspecies
- S. p. caniceps S. p. pusilla S. p. insularis
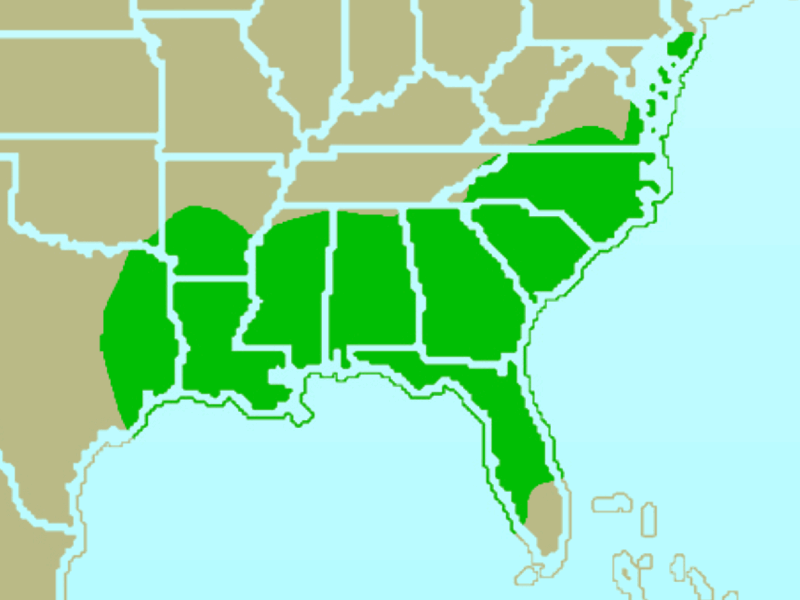
- Range of S. pusilla

= Brown-headed nuthatch =

Species of bird

The brown-headed nuthatch (Sitta pusilla) is a small songbird endemic to pine forests throughout the Southeastern United States. Genetic analyses indicated low differentiation between northern and southern populations in Florida, but the study also found lower genetic diversity among south Florida populations that may be a result of the increased habitat fragmentation that was documented. The Bahama nuthatch was formerly considered a subspecies (S. p. insularis), but has since been reclassified as its own separate species. Two recent studies assessing vocalizations in Bahama and continental nuthatch populations found important differences. One of the studies also demonstrated that continental and Bahama populations did not respond aggressively to calls of the other population. This type of call-response study is often used to help define cryptic species.

The bird, like other nuthatches, possesses a sharp black nail-like beak, which it uses to pound open seeds. It is a frequent visitor to feeding stations and is highly fond of sunflower seeds and suet cakes. Bold and inquisitive, this bird is readily approachable by humans.

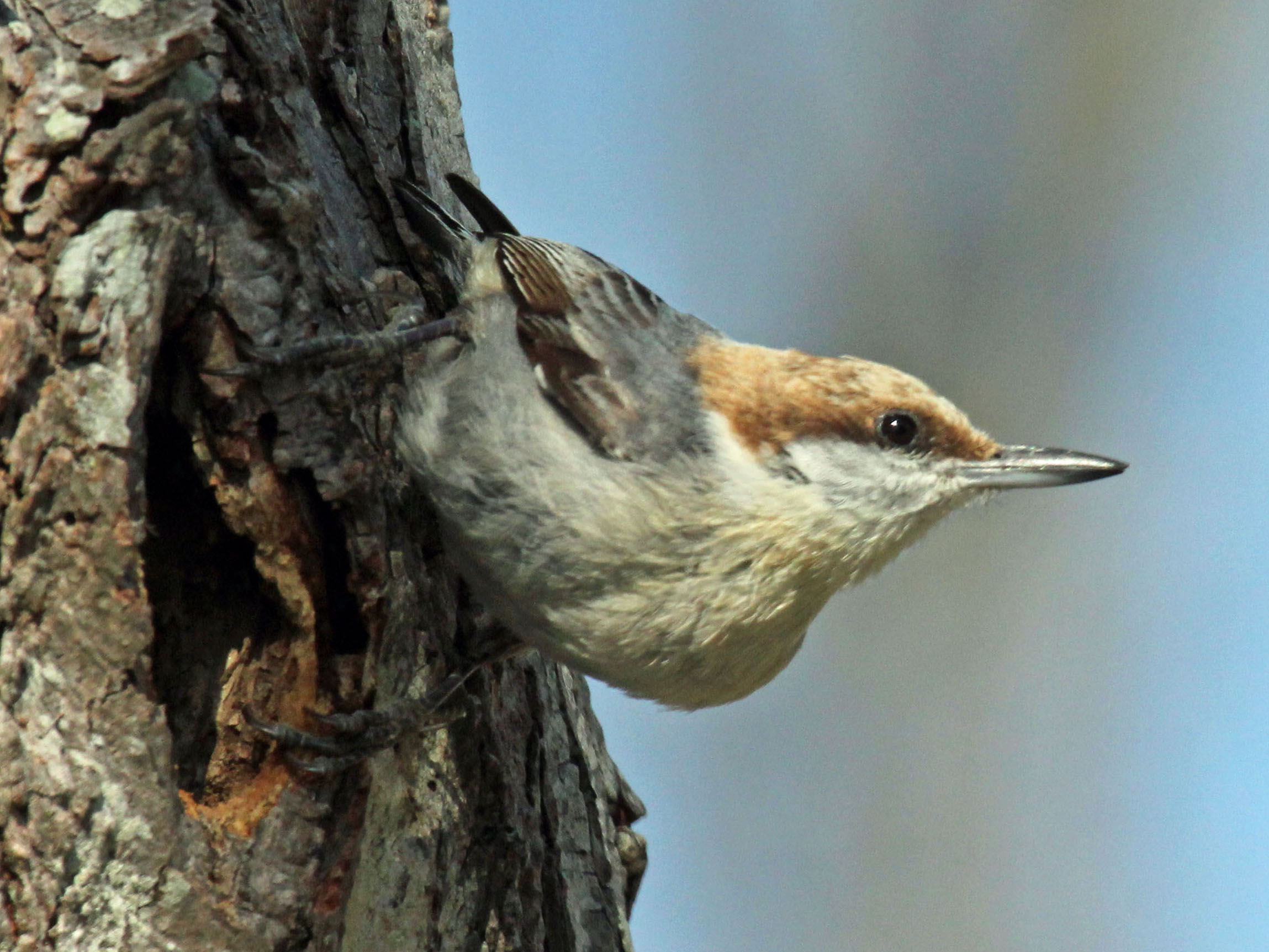
At Ash, North Carolina

The bird is regularly observed using a small chips of bark, small twigs, and pine needles held in its beak as tools to dig for insects. The nuthatch exhibits other curious behaviors such as cooperative groups where groups of 3–5 adults provide care at a single nest. Recent genetic assessments suggest some of the putatively non-breeding adults associated with these groups may actually breed with individuals in neighboring territories. This nuthatch also exhibits a wide range of other social behaviors that include social grooming and male-female duets similar to those observed for the pygmy nuthatch.

The brown-headed nuthatch has been found to prefer making their nests at the top of short snags.

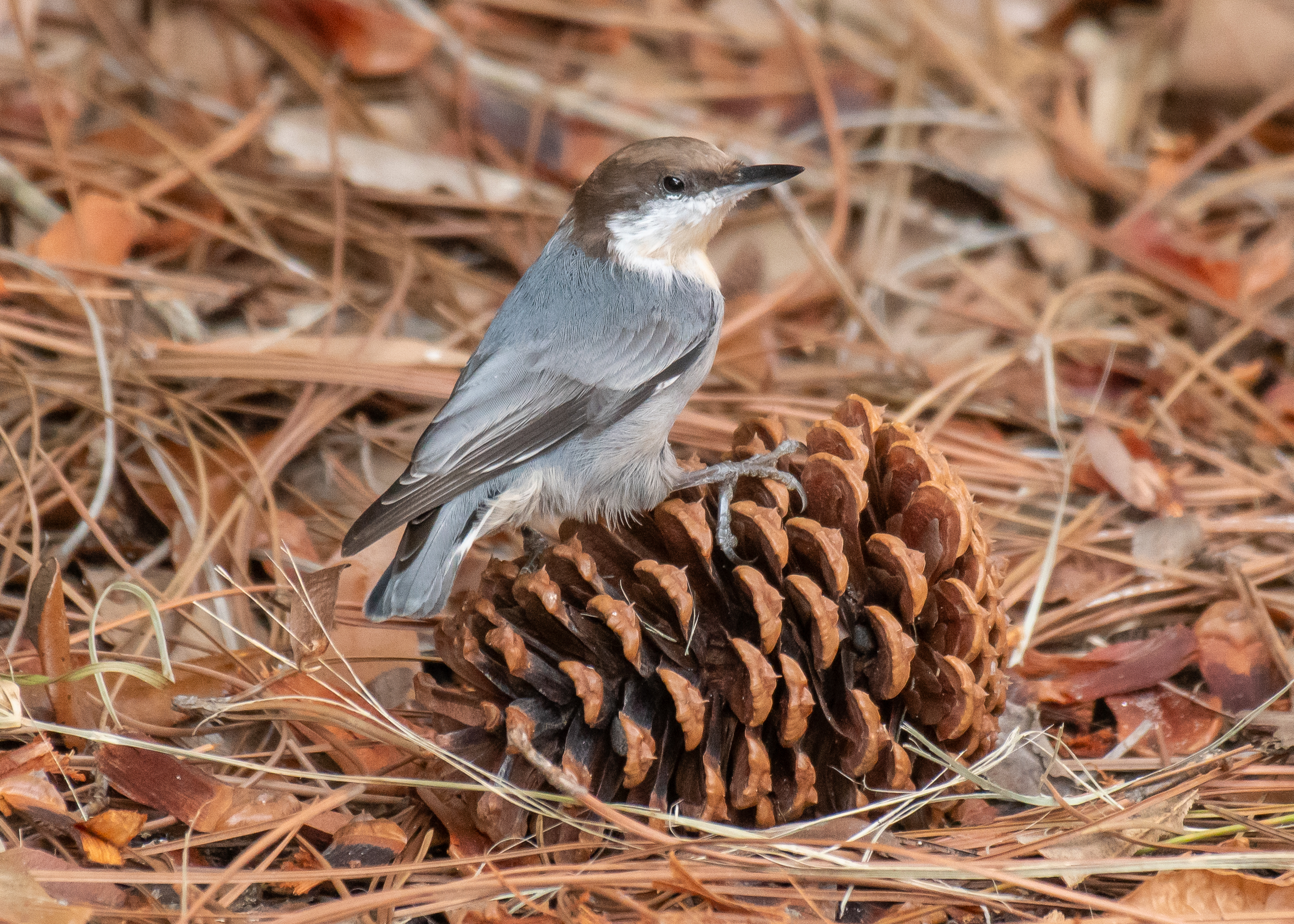
A Brown-headed Nuthatch perches on a pinecone (South Carolina, 2025).

Despite the other species' common name, the brown-headed nuthatch is about the same size as the pygmy nuthatch and the two species are the world's smallest nuthatches. In the brown-headed nuthatch, the total length is 9–11 cm (3.5–4.3 in), wingspan is 16–18 cm (6.3–7.1 in) and body mass is 10–12 g (0.35–0.42 oz). This species sports a brown cap with narrow black eyeline and buff white cheeks, chin, and belly. Its wings are bluish-gray in color. A small white spot is found at the nape of the neck. The bird's call is a sharp whee-hyah that sounds very similar to a "rubber duck" toy and is notably loud for a bird of its size. They also make softer "pit pit pit" calls while in flight as well as other squeaking noises. If heard or seen clearly, this species is virtually unmistakable in the wild, since it overlaps only with the very differently marked and larger red-breasted and white-breasted nuthatches.
