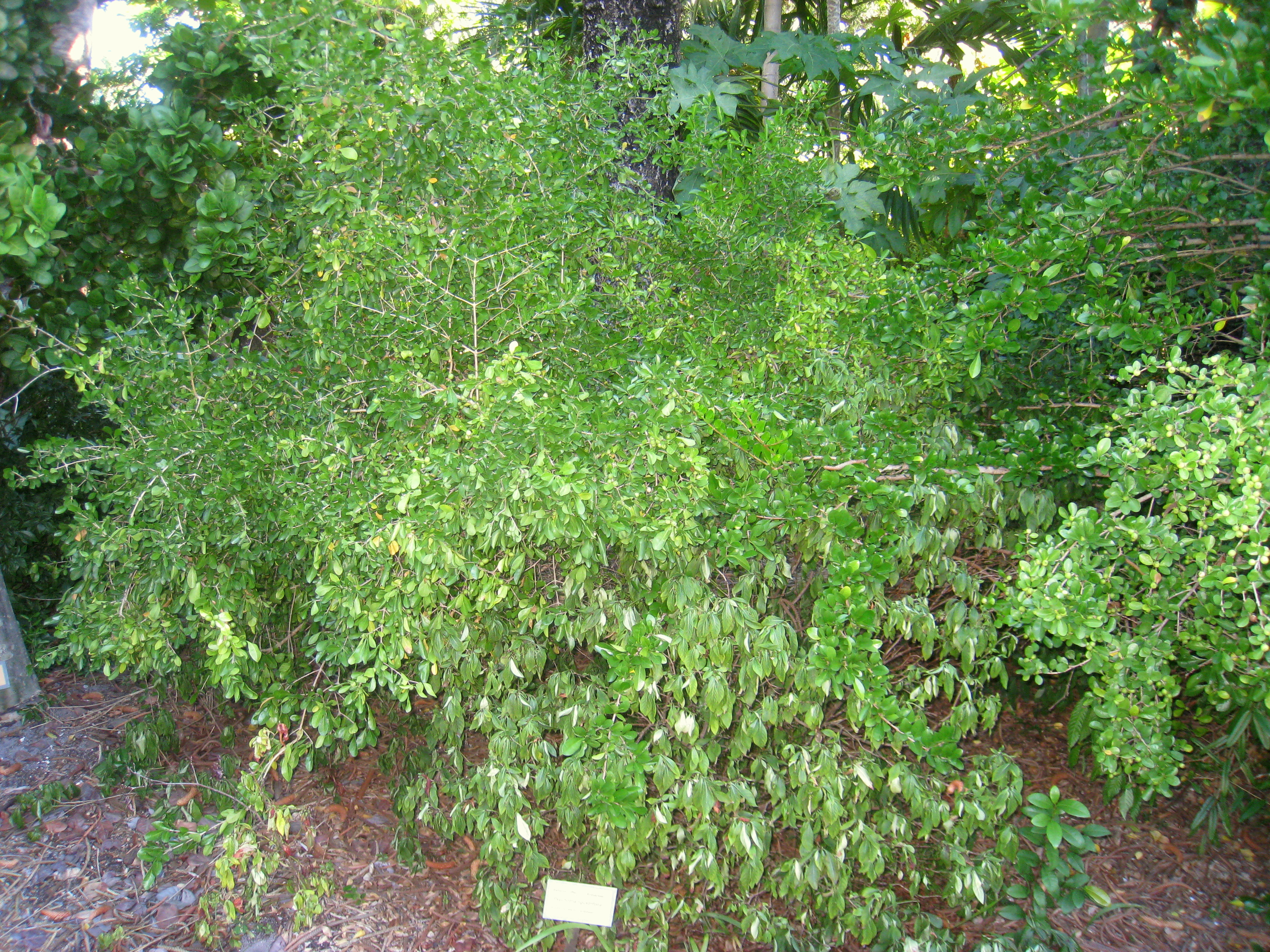

Conservation status
- Least Concern (IUCN 3.1)

Scientific classification
- Kingdom: Plantae
- Clade: Tracheophytes
- Clade: Angiosperms
- Clade: Eudicots
- Clade: Asterids
- Order: Gentianales
- Family: Rubiaceae
- Genus: Psychotria
- Species: P. ligustrifolia

Binomial name
- Psychotria ligustrifolia (Northrop) Millsp.

= Psychotria ligustrifolia =

Species of plant

Psychotria ligustrifolia, the Bahama wild coffee, is a species of plant in the family Rubiaceae. It is native to Florida, Puerto Rico, and the Bahamas.

== Synonyms ==
- Psychotria bahamensis

== See also ==
- Bahamian dry forests
