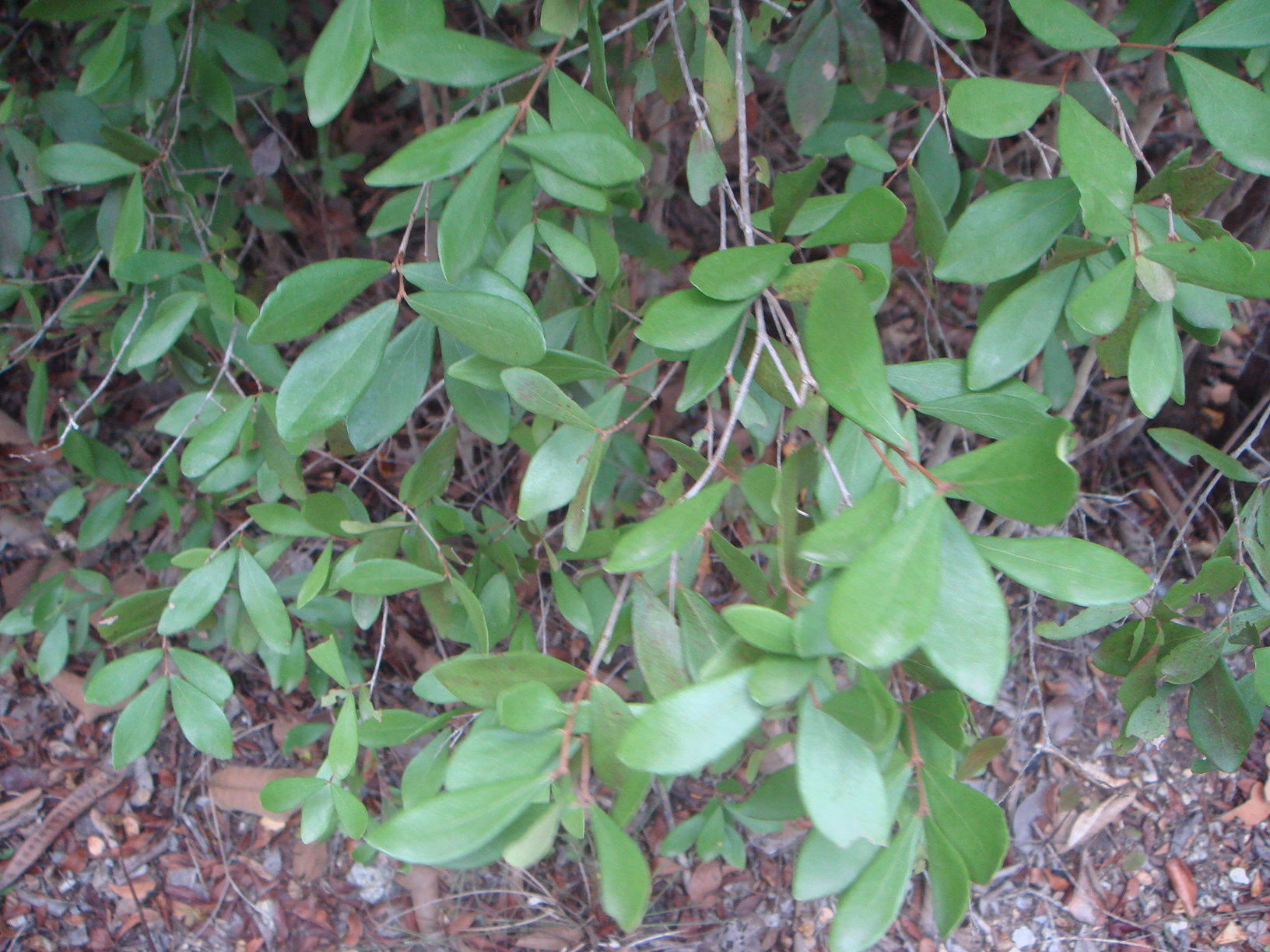

Conservation status
- Least Concern (IUCN 3.1)

Scientific classification
- Kingdom: Plantae
- Clade: Tracheophytes
- Clade: Angiosperms
- Clade: Eudicots
- Clade: Rosids
- Order: Myrtales
- Family: Myrtaceae
- Genus: Eugenia
- Species: E. foetida

Binomial name
- Eugenia foetida Pers.

= Eugenia foetida =

Species of flowering plant

Eugenia foetida is a member of the family Myrtaceae, the myrtle family, and is colloquially referred to as "Spanish stopper" or "boxleaf stopper."

It is found year-round in the understory of mangrove forests, coastal hammocks and dunes in coastal, central to southern Florida, and east in the Bahamas. The species is also native to numerous other parts of the Caribbean as well as in Mexico, Belize and Guatemala.

== Description ==
It is a common small tree with opposite leaves that are dark green on the adaxial (upper or dorsal) leaf surface and lighter on the abaxial (lower or ventral) surface and oblanceolate with a rounded or obtuse apex. The specific epithet foetida, Latin for "fetid" refers to the unpleasant scent of the flowers.

== See also ==
- Bahamian dry forests
- South Florida rocklands
