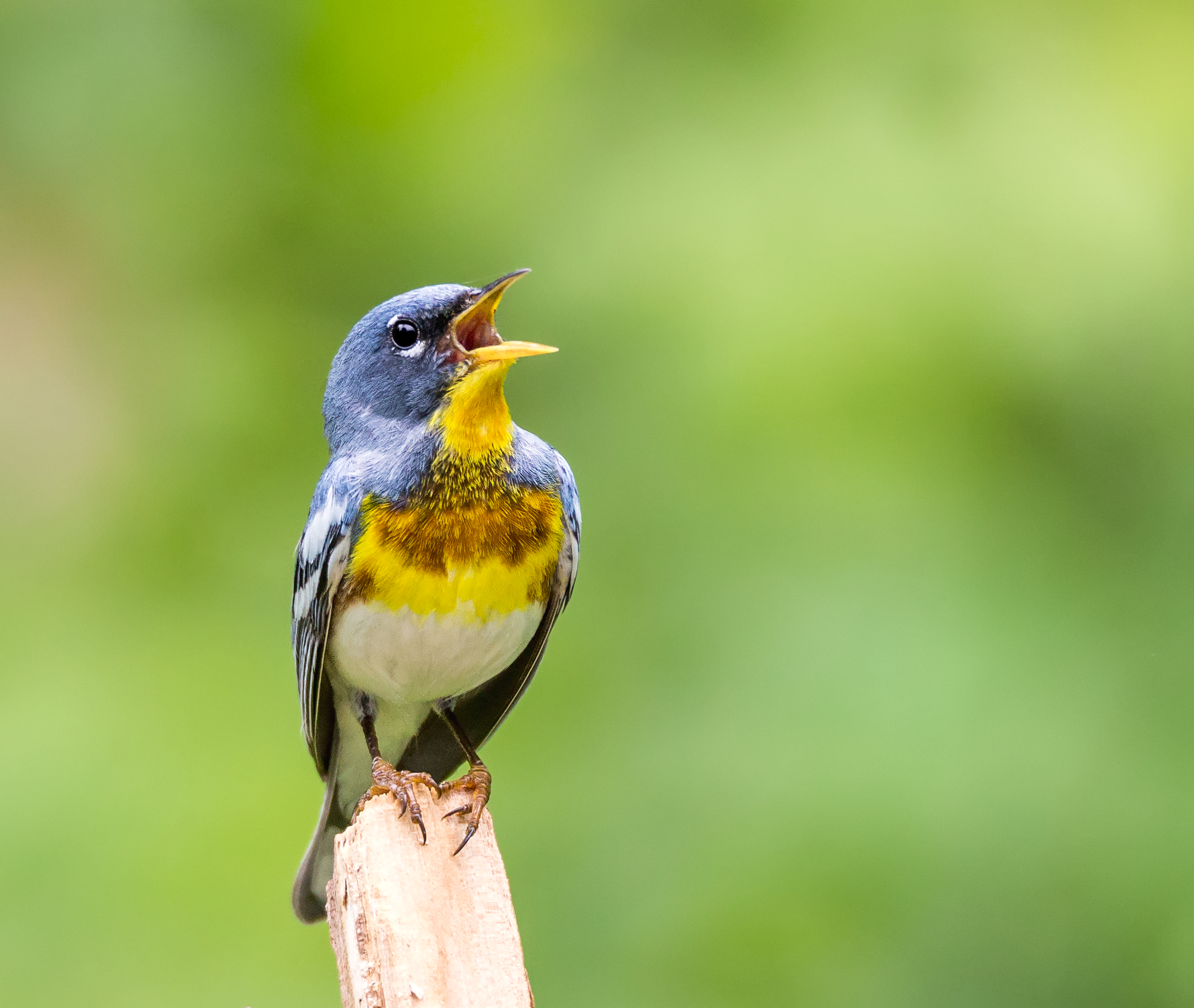
- Male
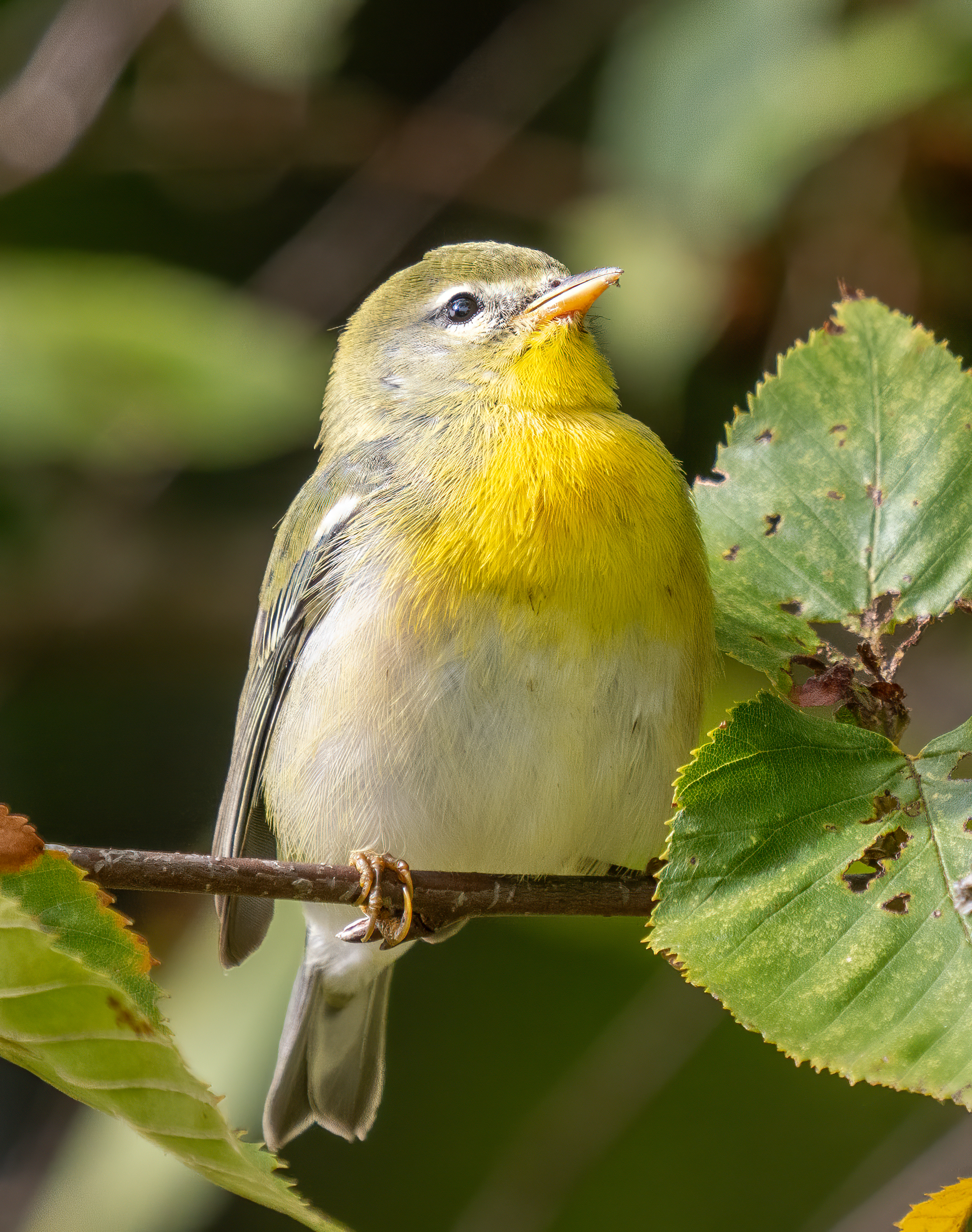
- Female

Conservation status
- Least Concern (IUCN 3.1)

Scientific classification
- Kingdom: Animalia
- Phylum: Chordata
- Class: Aves
- Order: Passeriformes
- Family: Parulidae
- Genus: Setophaga
- Species: S. americana

Binomial name
- Setophaga americana (Linnaeus, 1758)
- Range of S. americana Breeding range Wintering range

Synonyms
- Parus americanus Linnaeus, 1758; Compsothlyphis americana (Linnaeus, 1758); Parula americana (Linnaeus, 1758)

= Northern parula =

Species of bird

The northern parula (Setophaga americana) is a small New World warbler. It is migratory and breeds in eastern North America from southern Canada to Florida.

== Taxonomy ==
The northern parula was formally described in 1758 by the Swedish naturalist Carl Linnaeus in the tenth edition of his Systema Naturae. He placed it with the tits in the genus Parus and coined the binomial name Parus americanus. Linnaeus based his account on "The Finch-Creeper" that had been described and illustrated in 1731 by the English naturalist Mark Catesby in his book The Natural History of Carolina, Florida and the Bahama Islands. Linnaeus specified the type locality as northern America, but in 1931 this was restricted to South Carolina by the American Ornithologists' Union. The northern parula was moved from the genus Parus to the genus Setophaga based on a molecular phylogenetic study of the Parulidae that was published in 2010. The species is considered to be monotypic, with no subspecies recognized. Northern parulas will occasionally hybridize with yellow-throated warblers, resulting in a hybrid species known as Sutton's warblers.

The genus name Setophaga is from Ancient Greek ses, "moth", and phagos, "eating", and the specific americana is Latin for "American". The common name "Parula" ultimately derives from Latin parrula, referring to the tit family, and not from the scientific name of the New World warbler family, Parulidae. Confusion between the two has led to common mispronunciation of the bird's common name, as parrula is pronounced with emphasis on the first syllable while Parulidae is pronounced with emphasis on the second syllable.

== Description ==
The northern parula is one of the smaller North American migratory warblers, often being one of the smallest birds in a mixed feeding flock besides kinglets or gnatcatchers. Length is 10.8 to 12.4 cm (4.3 to 4.9 in), wingspan is 16 to 18 cm (6.3 to 7.1 in) and body weight is 5 to 11 g (0.18 to 0.39 oz). Among standard measurements, the wing chord is 5.1 to 6.5 cm (2.0 to 2.6 in), the tail is 3.7 to 4.5 cm (1.5 to 1.8 in), the bill is 0.8 to 1.1 cm (0.31 to 0.43 in) and the tarsus is 1.5 to 1.8 cm (0.59 to 0.71 in). This species has mainly blue-gray upper parts, with a greenish back patch and two white wing bars. The breast is yellowish shading into the white belly. The summer male has bluish and rufous breast bands and prominent white eye crescents. At the end of the breeding season, individuals molt into a duller version of the breeding plumage. Females are similar-looking but tend to be duller and lack the breast bands. The unique breastband fades in males and may disappear altogether in females.

Its song is a click-like trill or buzz, zeeeeee-yip and the call is a soft chip.

== Distribution and habitat ==
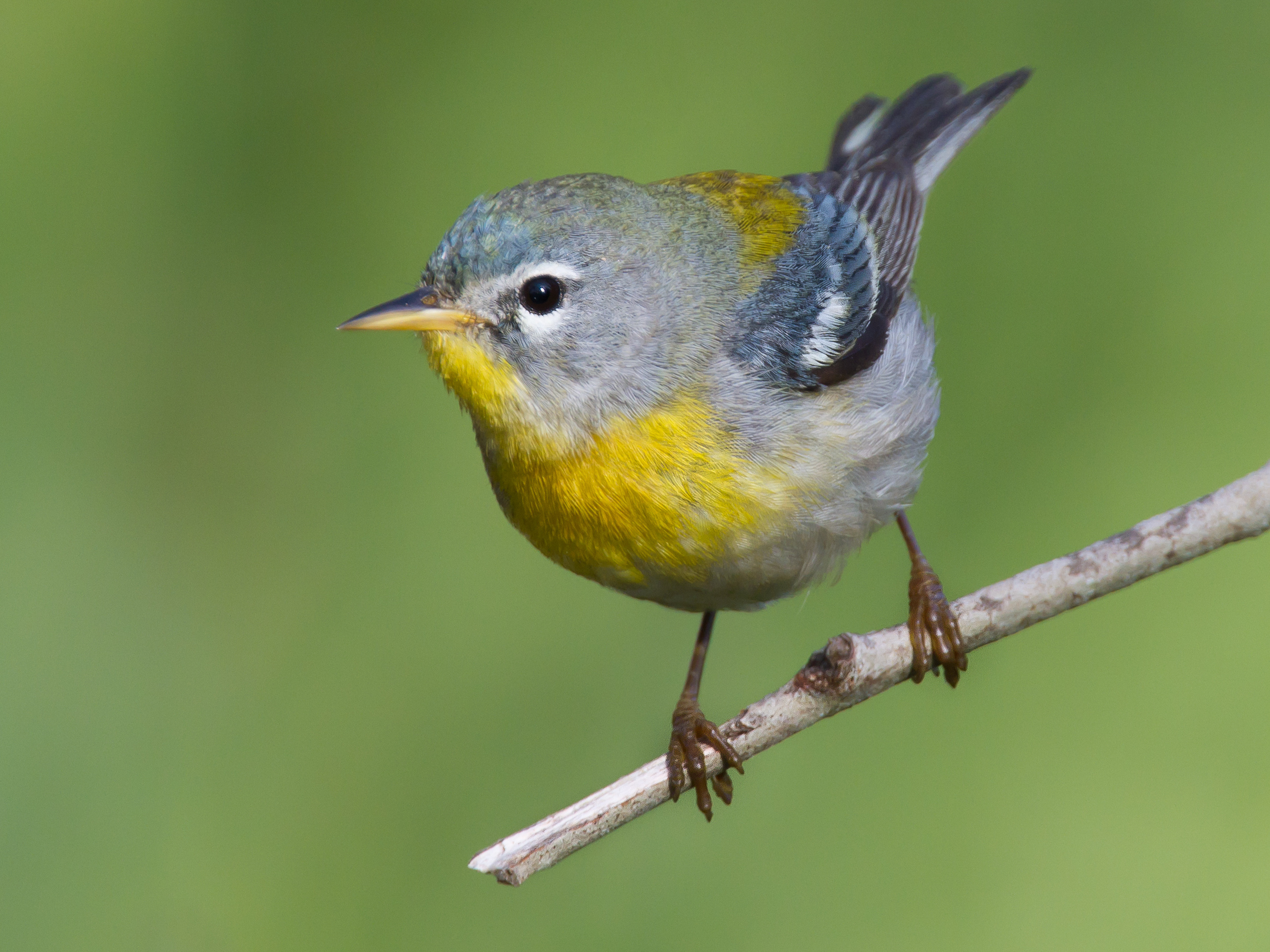
At Galveston, Texas during spring migration

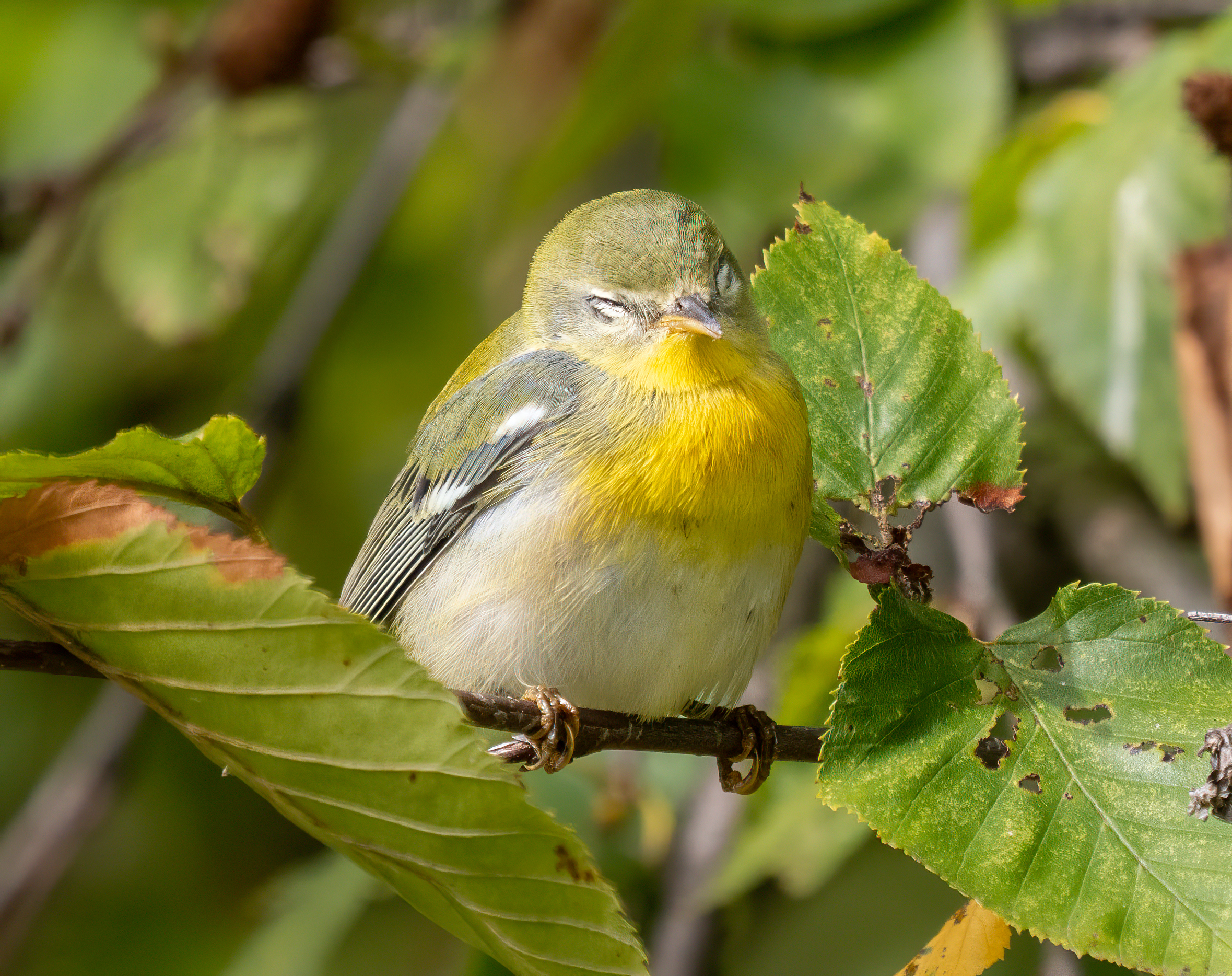
Resting during fall migration in New York

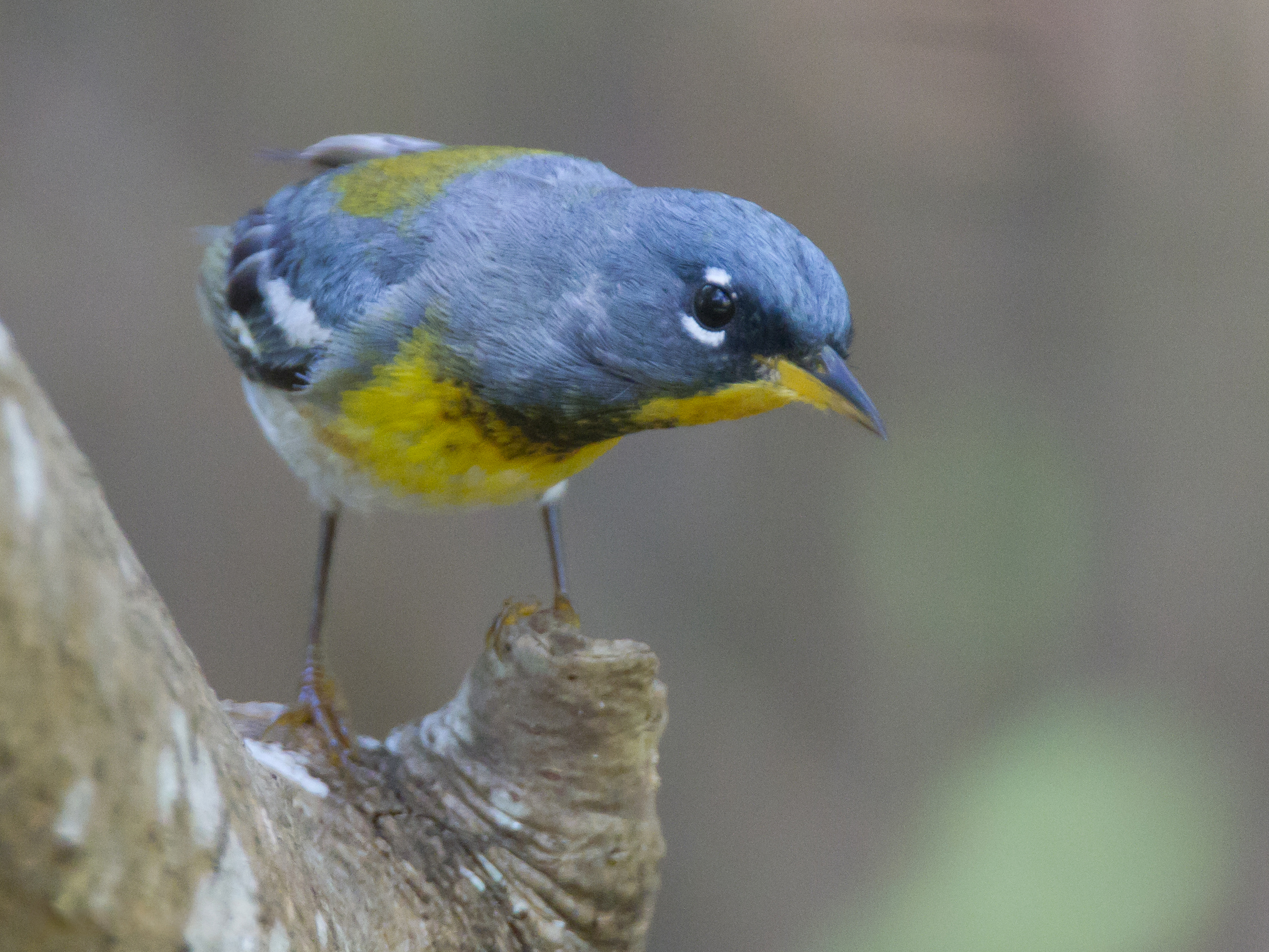
At High Island, Texas

This species is migratory, wintering in southern Florida, northern Central America, the West Indies and most of the Lesser Antilles. This species is a very rare vagrant to western Europe.

While the species is still common as a breeder across most of eastern North America, there are conspicuous gaps in their breeding range that were likely once breeding grounds. They have been extirpated as a breeder from much of the Midwest as well as from many areas in Massachusetts, New Jersey, Connecticut, New York, Rhode Island and Vermont. Explanations for the disappearance may be changes in habitat or increasing air pollution, which limited the growth of epiphytes on trees that the warbler depended on for nesting. A further explanation is the clear-cutting and bog draining that have significantly reduced the amount of suitable habitat in eastern North America.

The northern parula inhabits various habitats depending on season and location. This is primarily a forest-dwelling species, but the northern and southern breeding populations select different habitats. In general, abundance of this species has been found to be positively correlated with increased tree species diversity, canopy height, and percent canopy cover. Northern populations breed in mature, moist coniferous forests. This species constructs its pendulum nests in hanging vegetation and so it is often attracted to suspended clumps of moss or coniferous twigs that are more abundant in moist spruce bogs or hemlock swamps. Southern populations breed in mature, moist, bottomland forest where Spanish moss is prevalent. Outside of the breeding season, the northern parula becomes more of a habitat generalist and may be found in a wide variety of habitats during migration and winter. These habitats may include shrubby pastures; moist, dry or wet forests; and agricultural fields or plantations.

== Behavior and ecology ==
Song and calls

=== Breeding ===
The northern parula is considered a monogamous species; however, a few cases of polygamy have been reported. Southern populations can start breeding as soon as March but in the north of the range, the species does not nest until May. The breeding habitat is humid woodland with growths of Old Man's Beard lichen or Spanish moss. Northern parulas nest in trees in clumps of these lichens (Old Man's Beard; Usnea) or plants (Spanish moss; Tillandsia usneoides), laying 3–7 eggs in a scantily lined cup nest. Sites located near water sources are preferred and many nests are found at the end of branches suspended over water. Due to their longer breeding season, southern populations of northern parula frequently raise two broods, as opposed to northern populations, which raise only one. The female hollows out a clump of vegetation in the moss and proceeds to fill the cavity with vegetation fibers, animal hair, grass, or pine needles. These nests average 7 cm (2.8 in) in outside diameter. The incubation period typically lasts 12–14 days and the young fledge at 10–11 days. Breeding maturity is attained the following year.

=== Food and feeding ===
The northern parula forages mostly or entirely on arboreal invertebrates. Prey items include spiders, damselflies, locusts, bugs, grasshoppers, aphids, beetles, caterpillars, flies, wasps, bees, and ants. Regardless of season, caterpillars and spiders are consumed most often. During the winter, the northern parula consumes more beetles and occasionally forages on berries, seeds, and nectar. This species primarily captures prey from vegetation by a hover-glean method, however this species is versatile in using a variety of foraging methods. It may make short flights from a perch to snatch prey in mid-flight or even hang upside-down to forage. It is most often seen foraging in the mid- to upper canopy levels of vegetation. Though most foraging activity occurs in arboreal vegetation, this species occasionally forages on or around the ground as well.

A northern parula from Augusta, Georgia was found to be a host of an intestinal acanthocephalan worm, Apororhynchus amphistomi.
