= Bahamian pineyards =

Tropical and subtropical coniferous forest ecoregion

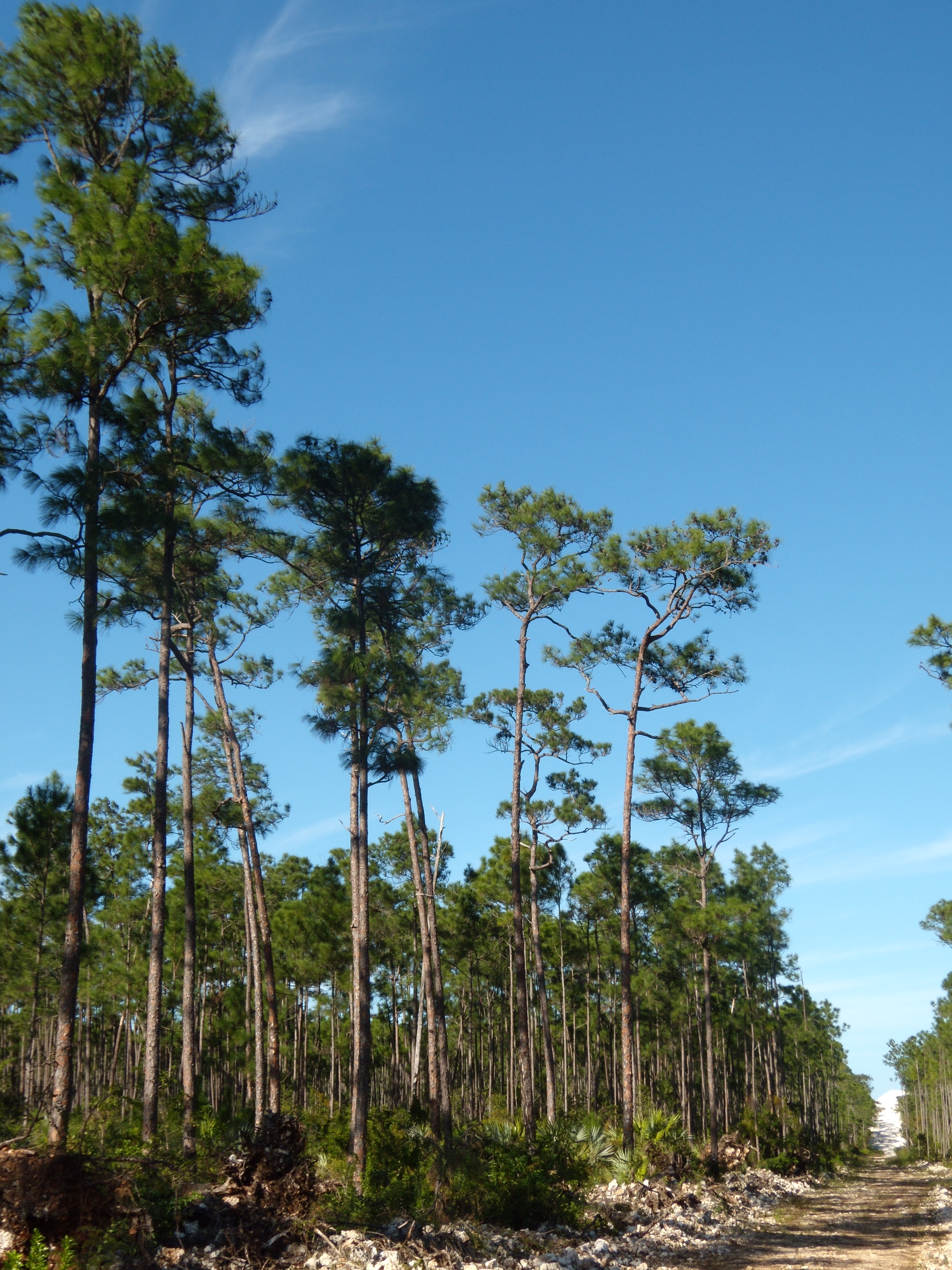
- South Andros, The Bahamas

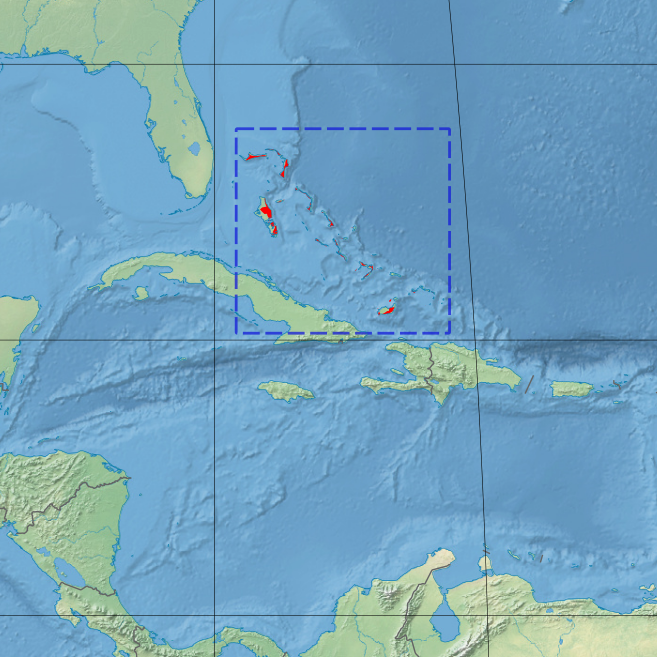
- Ecoregion territory (in red)

Ecology
- Realm: Neotropical
- Biome: tropical and subtropical coniferous forests
- Borders: Bahamian dry forests; Greater Antilles mangroves

Geography
- Area: 2,100 km^{2} (810 mi^{2})
- Countries: The Bahamas; Turks and Caicos Islands

Conservation
- Conservation status: Critical/endangered

The Bahamian pineyards are a tropical and subtropical coniferous forest ecoregion in the Bahamas and the Turks and Caicos Islands.

== Geography ==
The Bahamian pineyards cover an area of 2,100 km^{2} (810 sq mi). Pineyards are found on four of the northern islands in the Bahamas: Andros, Abaco, Grand Bahama, where they cover half of the island, and New Providence, as well as the Caicos Islands.

== Origin and history ==
Despite having a rich modern flora and fauna and being critically important to native and endemic species of the Bahamas, preserved pollen records collected from sinkholes indicate that the pineyards, or at least the ones of the northern Bahamas (Abaco, Grand Bahama, New Providence, and Andros) have a largely anthropogenic origin. Prior to the arrival of the Lucayan people, the northern Bahamas were originally covered in Bahamian dry forests composed primarily of poisonwood (Metopium toxiferum), gumbo-limbo (Bursera simaruba), and Fabaceae, Arecaceae, Eugenia, and Solanum species, with a unique reptile-dominated faunal community: the top herbivore of this habitat was the extinct Albury's tortoise (Chelonoidis alburyorum) and the top predator was the now-extirpated Cuban crocodile (Crocodylus rhombifer). The presence of conifers like Pinus and Juniperus was likely minimal and localized around this time.

Following the arrival of the Lucayans around 830 CE, large reptiles became extinct or extirpated within 1–2 centuries, and the original hardwood forests were cleared between 875 and 1090 CE by increasing harvesting for firewood and a newly introduced fire regime for the purposes of cassava cultivation, leading to the islands having a more open habitat increasingly dominated by weedy, secondary-successional species such as southern bayberry (Myrica cerifera), West Indian nettle tree (Trema lamarckianum) and Vachellia species. Pollen records indicate that the pine population significantly increased after 970 CE, with the modern pyrogenic pine forests being established by 1200 CE. An expansion of Barbados juniper (Juniperus barbadensis) also happened at the expense of the pines between 1400 and 1500.

Between 1510 and 1765, after most of the Lucayans had been enslaved by the Spaniards and taken to Hispaniola, a series of hurricanes led to the inundation of most of the low-lying pineyards with these being taken over by mangroves, causing the pineyards to be restricted to upland areas. However, there was a new expansion of pineyards after the American Revolution when Loyalists took over the islands and reintroduced a fire regime for agricultural opportunities. However, over next three centuries, human activities post-colonization again lead to a decline in the extent of the pineyards.

== Flora ==
Pineyards are dominated by Bahamian pine (Pinus caribaea var. bahamensis), while pinepink (Bletia purpurea), bushy beard grass (Andropogon glomeratus), southern bracken fern (Pteridium aquilinum), Florida clover ash (Tetrazygia bicolor), Bahamian trumpet tree (Tabebuia bahamensis), West Indian snowberry (Chiococca alba), devil's gut (Cassytha filiformis), poisonwood (Metopium toxiferum), coontie (Zamia integrifolia) and thatch palm (Coccothrinax argentata) grow in the understory. Without regular wildfires, pineyards are supplanted by broadleafed coppice. Young Bahamian pines require extensive amounts of sunlight to grow, and are resistant to fire once they become adults.

== Fauna ==
Fauna found in the pine forests include reptiles, such as rock iguanas (Cyclura sp.) and boas (Epicrates sp.), and birds, such as the West Indian woodpecker (Melanerpes superciliaris), Bahama woodstar (Calliphlox evelynae), Bahama yellowthroat (Geothlypis rostrata), the possibly-extinct Bahama nuthatch (Sitta insularis), Bahama oriole (Icterus northropi), Bahama warbler (Setophaga flavescens) and Bahama swallow (Tachycineta cyaneoviridis). Kirtland's warblers (Dendroica kirtlandii) migrate every year from jack pine forests in the Lower Peninsula of Michigan to spend the winter in the Bahamian pineyards. The only mammal found is the buffy flower bat (Erophylla sezekorni). Many of these species are endemic to this habitat and depend on the pines, and are threatened by activities such as deforestation and storm damage that have led to declines in the extent of the forest.

== Threats ==
Increased logging of junipers after colonization and the pines themselves after the 20th century has again lead to a decline in the extent of the pineyards, which has been compounded by invasive species such as the beach sheoak (Casuarina equisetifolia) and the increasing frequency of hurricanes due to climate change; Hurricanes Frances, Jeanne, and especially Dorian have all dealt massive, lasting damage to the pineyards. At least one species of bird, the Bahama nuthatch (Sitta insularis) may have been driven to extinction in 2019 as a result of Hurricanes Matthew and Dorian; a distinct population of the Bahama oriole from Abaco was also extirpated in the 1990s following Hurricane Andrew. Evidence indicates that tropical hardwood forests such as the ones that formerly covered the Bahamas are naturally much more resilient to hurricane damage than pine-dominated ones; due to this, the special vulnerability of the pineyards ecosystem to climatic extremes may be due to its anthropogenic origin.

== Gallery ==
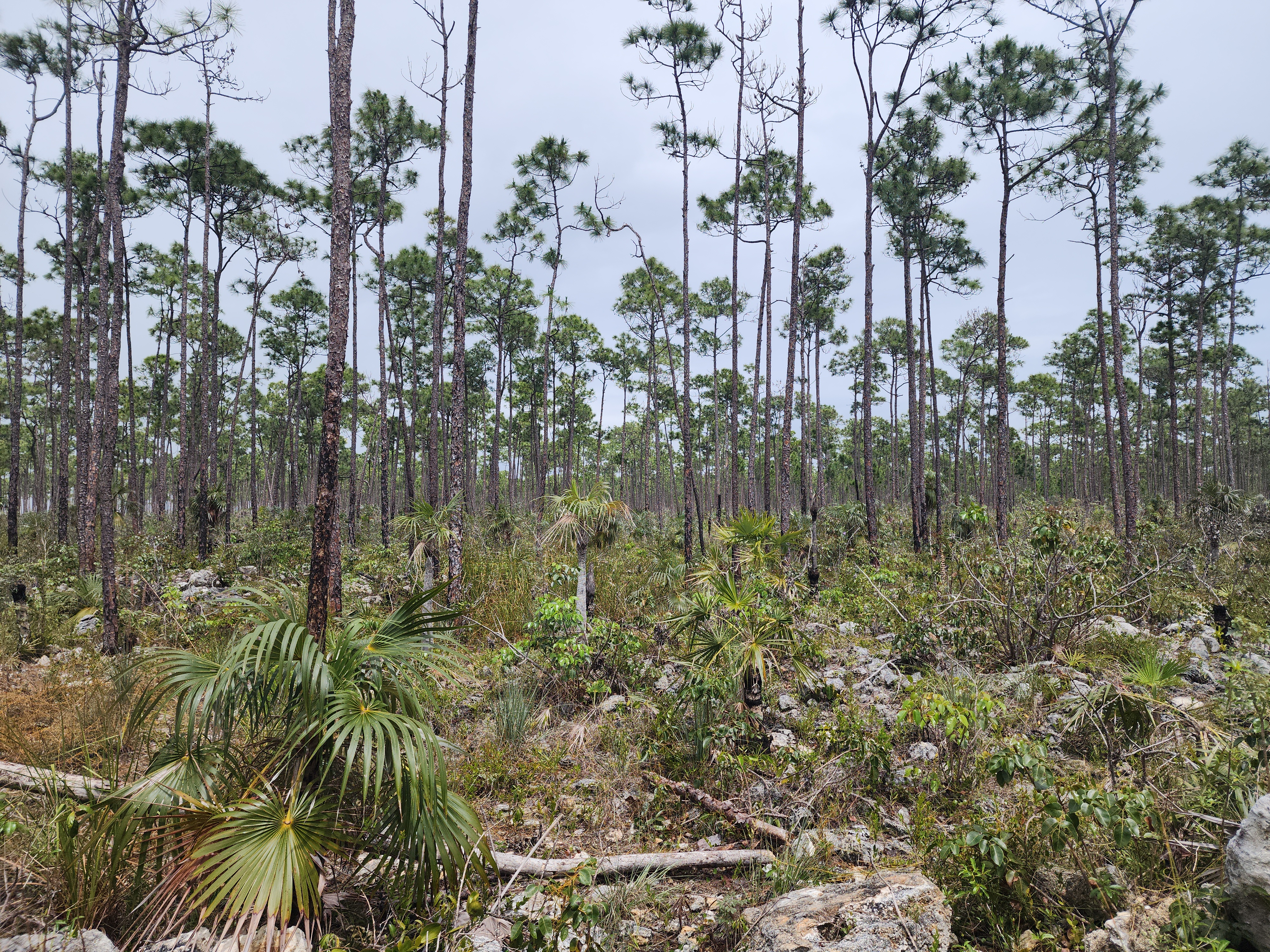
Submaritime pineyard, Great Abaco

== See also ==
- Bahamian dry forests
- Bahamas National Trust
- South Florida pine flatwoods
- Cuban pine forests
- South Florida rocklands
