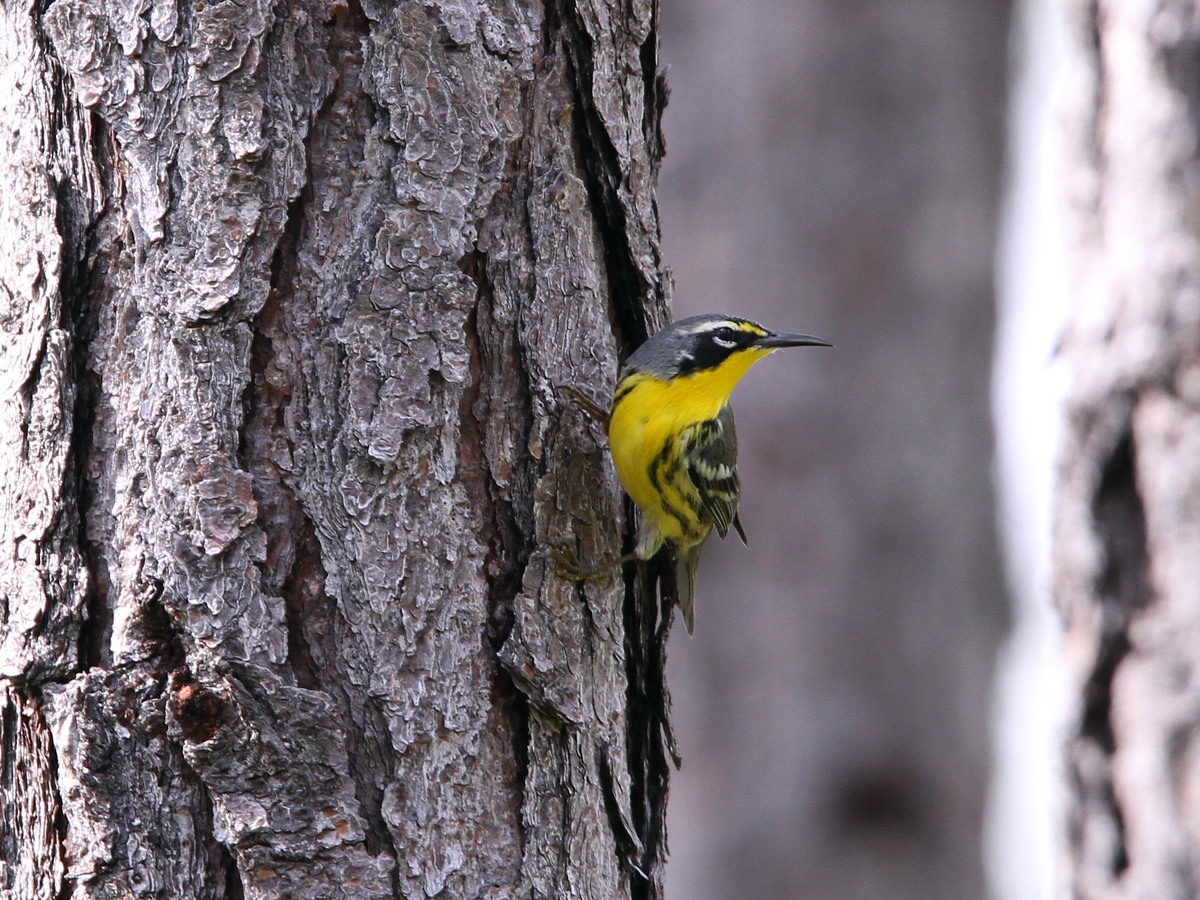

Conservation status
- Endangered (IUCN 3.1)

Scientific classification
- Kingdom: Animalia
- Phylum: Chordata
- Class: Aves
- Order: Passeriformes
- Family: Parulidae
- Genus: Setophaga
- Species: S. flavescens

Binomial name
- Setophaga flavescens (Todd, 1909)

Synonyms
- See text

= Bahama warbler =

Species of bird

The Bahama warbler (Setophaga flavescens) is an Endangered species of bird in the family Parulidae, the New World warblers. It is endemic to The Bahamas.

== Taxonomy and systematics ==
The Bahama warbler was formally described in 1909 as Dendroica flavescens. In 1930 James Bond lumped it as a subspecies of the yellow-throated warbler (then Dendroica dominica, now Setophaga dominica). By the late 1900s some authors were questioning that treatment and a study published in 2010 confirmed that it deserved full species status. The study found significant morphological, plumage, song, and genetic differences between the Bahama and yellow-throated warblers. Taxonomic systems began publishing the change in 2011.

The Bahama warbler is monotypic.

== Description ==
The Bahama warbler is 13 to 14 cm (5.1 to 5.5 in) long and weighs about 10 g (0.35 oz). Adult males have a gray forehead and forecrown, jet black lores and ear coverts, a long bright white supercilium with black streaks above it, a bright yellow spot in front of the eye, and a white arc below the eye. Their hindcrown, nape, and upperparts are grayish with a touch of brown. Their wing's lesser coverts are gray with black centers and their median and greater coverts are dusky gray with black centers and wide white tips that show as two wing bars. Their flight feathers are dusky with black centers and gray edges. Their tail feathers are dusky with black centers, gray edges, and large white patches on the outer three or four pairs. Their throat and upper breast are bright lemon yellow and their belly and flanks are slightly paler and buffier. They have distinct black streaks from the ear coverts along the sides of the breast and flanks.

Adult females have a similar pattern to male's but are overall not as bright. They have a gray forehead and forecrown, dark gray to blackish lores and ear coverts, a supercilium like the male's, a pale yellow spot in front of the eye, and the same white arc below the eye as males. Their hindcrown, nape, and upperparts are grayish with a noticeable brown tinge. Their wings and tail are mostly like the male's but do not have the black centers. They have white patches only on the outer three pairs of tail feathers. Their throat and upper breast are pale to somewhat bright lemon yellow and their belly and flanks are paler and buffier. They have black streaks from the ear coverts along the sides of the breast and flanks. Both sexes have a dark brown iris, slaty to dusky olive legs, and olive-brown feet with greenish yellow soles. Males have a black bill and females a slaty to blackish bill.

Compared to its former "parent" the yellow-throated warbler, the Bahama warbler has entirely yellow underparts versus the yellow-throated's white lower breast, belly, and undertail coverts. The yellow-throated has a black forehead and forecrown, a wider supercilium than the Bahama, a white patch on the sides of the neck, slate gray upperparts without brown, and mostly black wing and tail feathers. The Bahama warbler has a longer and thinner bill, longer legs, and shorter wings than the yellow-throated.

== Distribution and habitat ==
The Bahama warbler was originally found on Grand Bahama, Little Abaco, and Great Abaco islands, and recent lists include all three islands. However, the Cornell Lab of Ornithology's Birds of the World account (2025) states that following Hurricane Dorian's landfall the species has not been found on Grand Bahama. It inhabits (or inhabited) the Bahamian pineyards, an ecosystem dominated by Pinus caribaea bahamensis that has a mostly open canopy and limited woody understory. In contrast, the yellow-throated warbler, a winter migrant to the Bahamas, uses almost all available types of wooded landscapes.

== Behavior ==
=== Movement ===
The Bahama warbler is a year-round resident.

=== Feeding ===
The Bahama warbler feeds on insects and other invertebrates. It takes prey by gleaning from pine trees, especially from bark crevices and also the bark surface, twigs, and needles. The bark-probing is very unusual among the other warblers found in the Bahamas. It takes food from tree's trunks and canopy and in the forest understory. Individuals have been observed at the flowers of century plants (Agave braceana) but it is not known if they were seeking insects or nectar.

=== Breeding ===
The Bahama warbler is very territorial. However, nothing else is known about the species' breeding biology.

=== Vocalization ===
The male Bahama warbler sings "a series of loud, clear whistled notes, with a ringing quality". Compared to the yellow-throated warbler's song, in the Bahama warbler's song is shorter with fewer syllables, the first syllable's highest frequency is lower pitched, most syllables rise in pitch rather than descending, and the final two descend while those of the yellow-throated rise.

== Status ==
The IUCN originally in 2012 assessed the Bahama warbler as Near Threatened but since 2020 as Endangered. Its estimated population of between 500 and 1200 mature individuals is believed to be decreasing. "This species has a small population, which is split further into two small subpopulations. 95% of the overall population is additionally confined to one subpopulation only. It is threatened by the loss and degradation of its habitat, as well as being recently susceptible to climatic events." Following Hurricane Dorian its remaining pine forest habitat has been reduced to between 5 and 23 km^{2} (2 and 9 sq mi) on Grand Bahama and between 227 and 455 km^{2} (90 and 175 sq mi) on the Abacos. The Cornell Lab's "Priorities for Future Research" include intensive surveys on the islands to determine the species' actual population. It suggests using recordings of the species' song to elicit response or approach. It also suggests evaluating the feasibility of moving some birds from the Abacos to Grand Bahama.
