= List of birds of Florida =

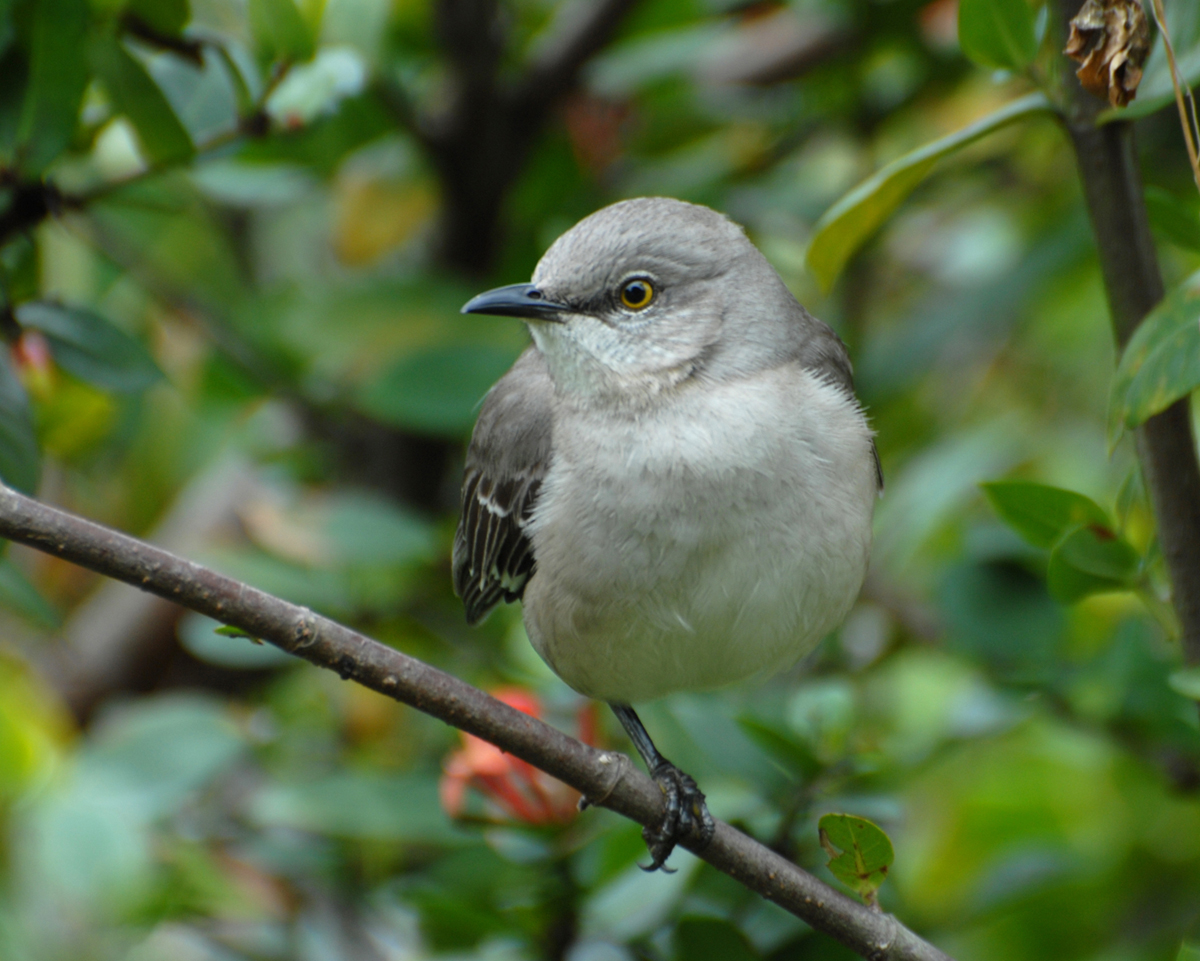
The northern mockingbird is the state bird of Florida

This list of birds of Florida includes species documented in the U.S. state of Florida and accepted by the Florida Ornithological Society Records Committee (FOSRC). As of November 2022, there were 539 species included in the official list. Of them, 168 species and eight identifiable subspecies are classed as accidental, 18 have been introduced to North America, four are extinct, and one has been extirpated. More than 100 "verifiable...exotic species [are] found free-flying in the wild" according to the FOSRC. Additional accidental, extirpated and recently extinct species have been added from other sources. Four hypothetical species have been also added from another source.

This list is presented in the taxonomic sequence of the Check-list of North and Middle American Birds, 7th edition through the 62nd Supplement, published by the American Ornithological Society (AOS). Common and scientific names are also those of the Check-list, except that the common names of families are from the Clements taxonomy because the AOS list does not include them.

The following status codes have been used to annotate some species:

- (A) Accidental – a species that occurs rarely or accidentally in Florida, and for which the FOSRC requests a full report for verification
- (I) Introduced – a species that has been introduced to North America by the actions of humans, either directly or indirectly, and has become established in Florida
- (E) Extinct – a recent bird that no longer exists
- (e) Extirpated – a species that is no longer in Florida, but exists elsewhere

== Ducks, geese, and waterfowl ==
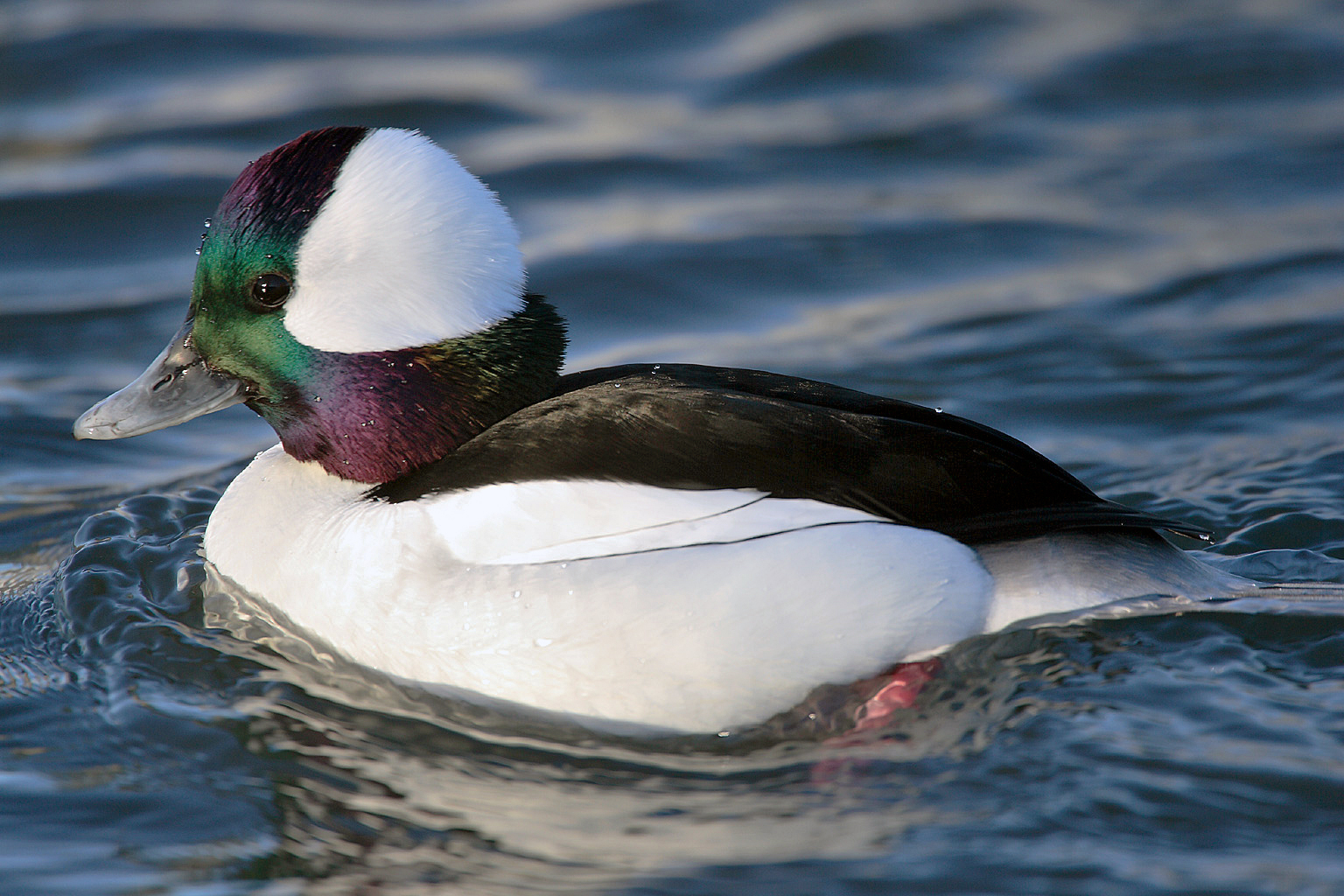
Bufflehead

Order: Anseriformes Family: Anatidae

The family Anatidae includes the ducks and most duck-like waterfowl, such as geese and swans. These birds are adapted to an aquatic existence with webbed feet, flattened bills, and feathers that are excellent at shedding water due to special oils.

- Snow goose, Anser caerulescens
- Ross's goose, Anser rossii
- Greater white-fronted goose, Anser albifrons
- Graylag goose, Anser anser (A)
- Brant, Branta bernicla (A)
- Canada goose, Branta canadensis
- Cackling goose, Branta hutchinsonii (A)
- Barnacle goose, Branta leucopsis (A)
- Trumpeter swan, Cygnus buccinator (A)
- Tundra swan, Cygnus columbianus (A)
- Whooper swan, Cygnus cygnus (A)
- West Indian whistling duck, Dendrocygna arborea (A)
- Black-bellied whistling-duck, Dendrocygna autumnalis
- Fulvous whistling-duck, Dendrocygna bicolor
- White-faced whistling duck, Dendrocygna viduata (A)
- Common shelduck, Tadorna tadorna (A)
- Egyptian goose, Alopochen aegyptiaca (I)
- Muscovy duck, Cairina moschata (I)
- Wood duck, Aix sponsa
- Blue-winged teal, Spatula discors
- Cinnamon teal, Spatula cyanoptera
- Northern shoveler, Spatula clypeata
- Gadwall, Mareca strepera
- Eurasian wigeon, Mareca penelope
- American wigeon, Mareca americana
- Eastern spot-billed duck, Anas zonorhyncha (A)
- Mallard, Anas platyrhynchos
- American black duck, Anas rubripes
- Mottled duck, Anas fulvigula
- White-cheeked pintail, Anas bahamensis (A)
- Northern pintail, Anas acuta
- Green-winged teal, Anas crecca
  - Common teal, A. c. crecca (A)
- Canvasback, Aythya valisineria
- Redhead, Aythya americana
- Ring-necked duck, Aythya collaris
- Tufted duck, Aythya fuligula (A?)
- Greater scaup, Aythya marila
- Lesser scaup, Aythya affinis
- King eider, Somateria spectabilis (A)
- Common eider, Somateria mollissima
- Harlequin duck, Histrionicus histrionicus (A)
- Surf scoter, Melanitta perspicillata
- White-winged scoter, Melanitta deglandi
- Black scoter, Melanitta americana
- Long-tailed duck, Clangula hyemalis
- Bufflehead, Bucephala albeola
- Common goldeneye, Bucephala clangula
- Barrow's goldeneye, Bucephala islandica (A)
- Labrador duck, Camptorhynchus labradorius (E)
- Hooded merganser, Lophodytes cucullatus
- Common merganser, Mergus merganser (A)
- Red-breasted merganser, Mergus serrator
- Masked duck, Nomonyx dominicus (A)
- Ruddy duck, Oxyura jamaicensis

== New World quail ==
Order: Galliformes Family: Odontophoridae

The New World quails are small, plump terrestrial birds only distantly related to the quails of the Old World, but named for their similar appearance and habits.

- Northern bobwhite, Colinus virginianus

== Pheasants, grouse, and allies ==
Order: Galliformes Family: Phasianidae

The Phasianidae is the family containing the pheasants and their allies. These are terrestrial birds, variable in size but generally plump, with broad, relatively short wings. Many are gamebirds or have been domesticated as a food source for humans.

- Wild turkey, Meleagris gallopavo
- Ruffed grouse, Bonasa umbellus (A)

== Flamingoes ==
Order: Phoenicopteriformes Family: Phoenicopteridae

Flamingoes are gregarious wading birds, usually 3 to 5 feet (0.9 to 1.5 m) tall, found in both the Western and Eastern Hemispheres. Flamingos filter-feed on shellfish and algae. Their oddly shaped beaks are adapted to separate mud and silt from the food they consume and, uniquely, are used upside-down.

- American flamingo, Phoenicopterus ruber

== Grebes ==
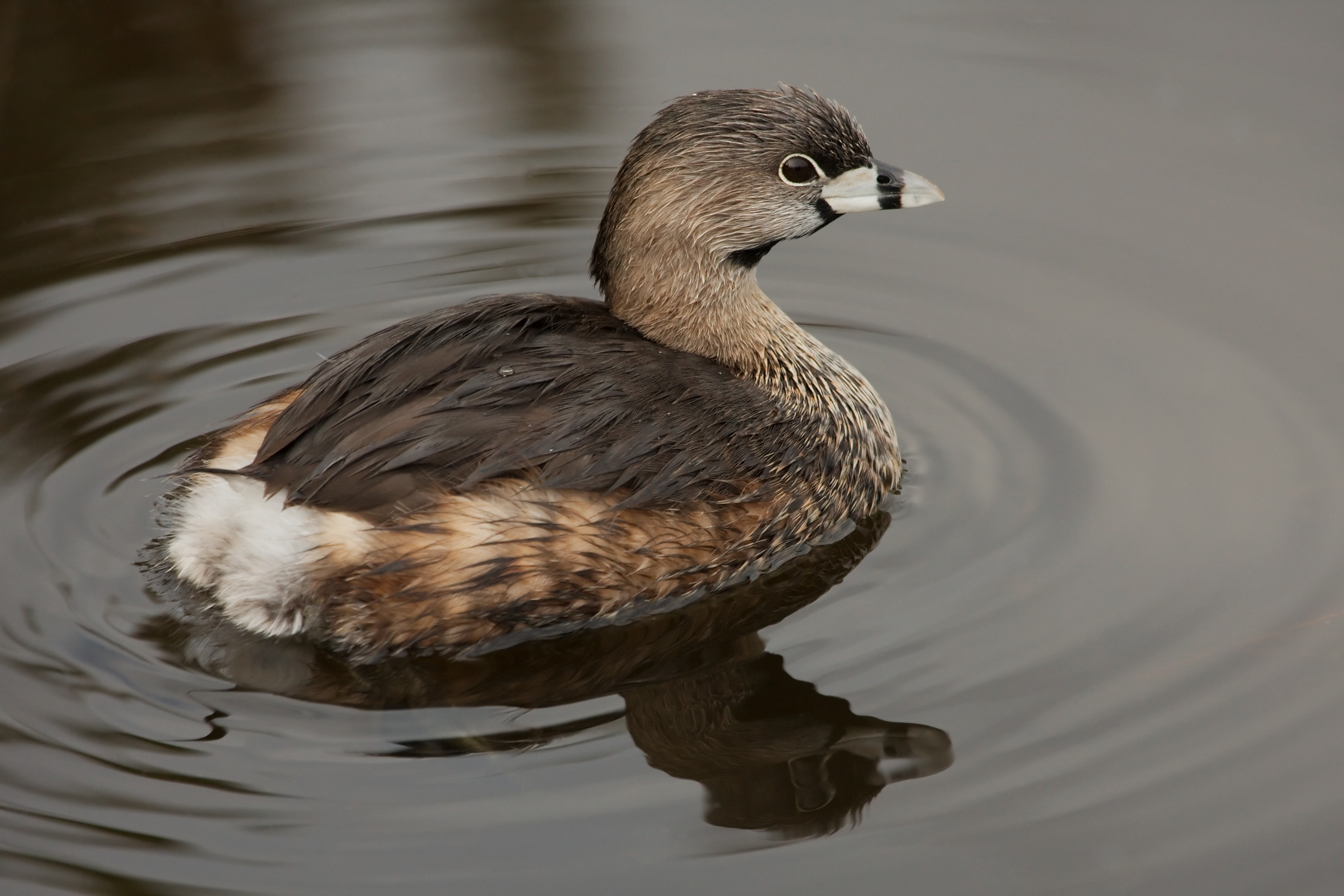
Pied-billed grebe

Order: Podicipediformes Family: Podicipedidae

Grebes are small to medium-large freshwater diving birds. They have lobed toes and are excellent swimmers and divers. However, they have their feet placed far back on the body, making them quite ungainly on land.

- Least grebe, Tachybaptus dominicus (A)
- Pied-billed grebe, Podilymbus podiceps
- Horned grebe, Podiceps auritus
- Red-necked grebe, Podiceps grisegena (A)
- Eared grebe, Podiceps nigricollis
- Western grebe, Aechmorphorus occidentalis (A)

== Pigeons and doves ==
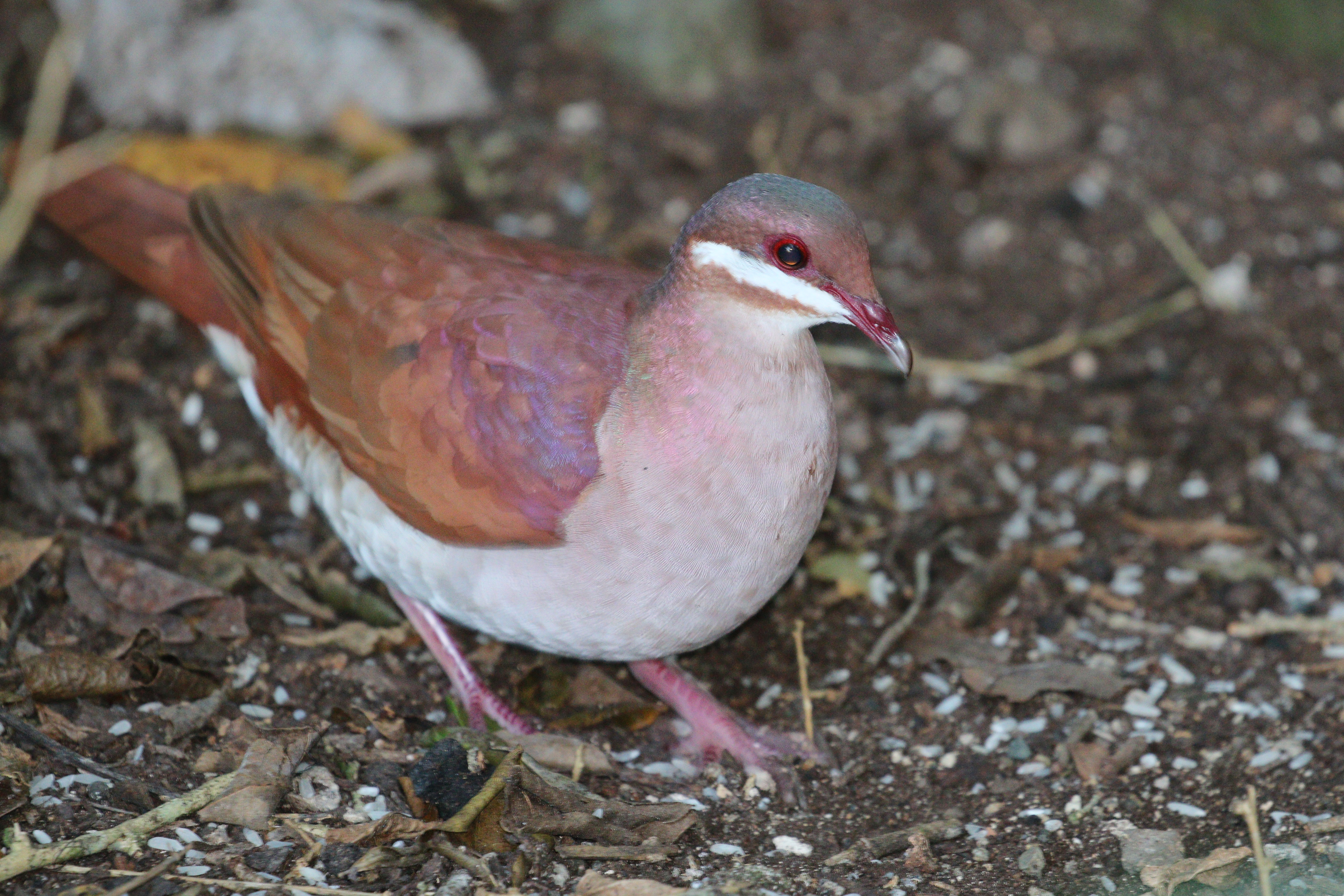
Key West quail-dove

Order: Columbiformes Family: Columbidae

Pigeons and doves are stout-bodied birds with short necks, and short slender bills with a fleshy cere.

- Rock pigeon, Columba livia (I)
- Scaly-naped pigeon, Patagioenas squamosa (A)
- White-crowned pigeon, Patagioenas leucocephala
- Band-tailed pigeon, Patagioenas fasciata (A)
- European turtle-dove, Streptopelia turtur (A)
- Eurasian collared-dove, Streptopelia decaocto (I)
- Passenger pigeon, Ectopistes migratorius (E)
- Inca dove, Columbina inca (A)
- Common ground dove, Columbina passerina
- Ruddy ground dove, Columbina talpacoti (A)
- Blue-headed quail-dove, Starnoenas cyanocephala (A)
- Ruddy quail-dove, Geotrygon montana (A)
- Key West quail-dove, Geotrygon chrysia
- White-tipped dove, Leptotila verreauxi (A)
- White-winged dove, Zenaida asiatica
- Eared dove, Zenaida auriculata (A)
- Zenaida dove, Zenaida aurita (A)
- Mourning dove, Zenaida macroura

== Cuckoos ==
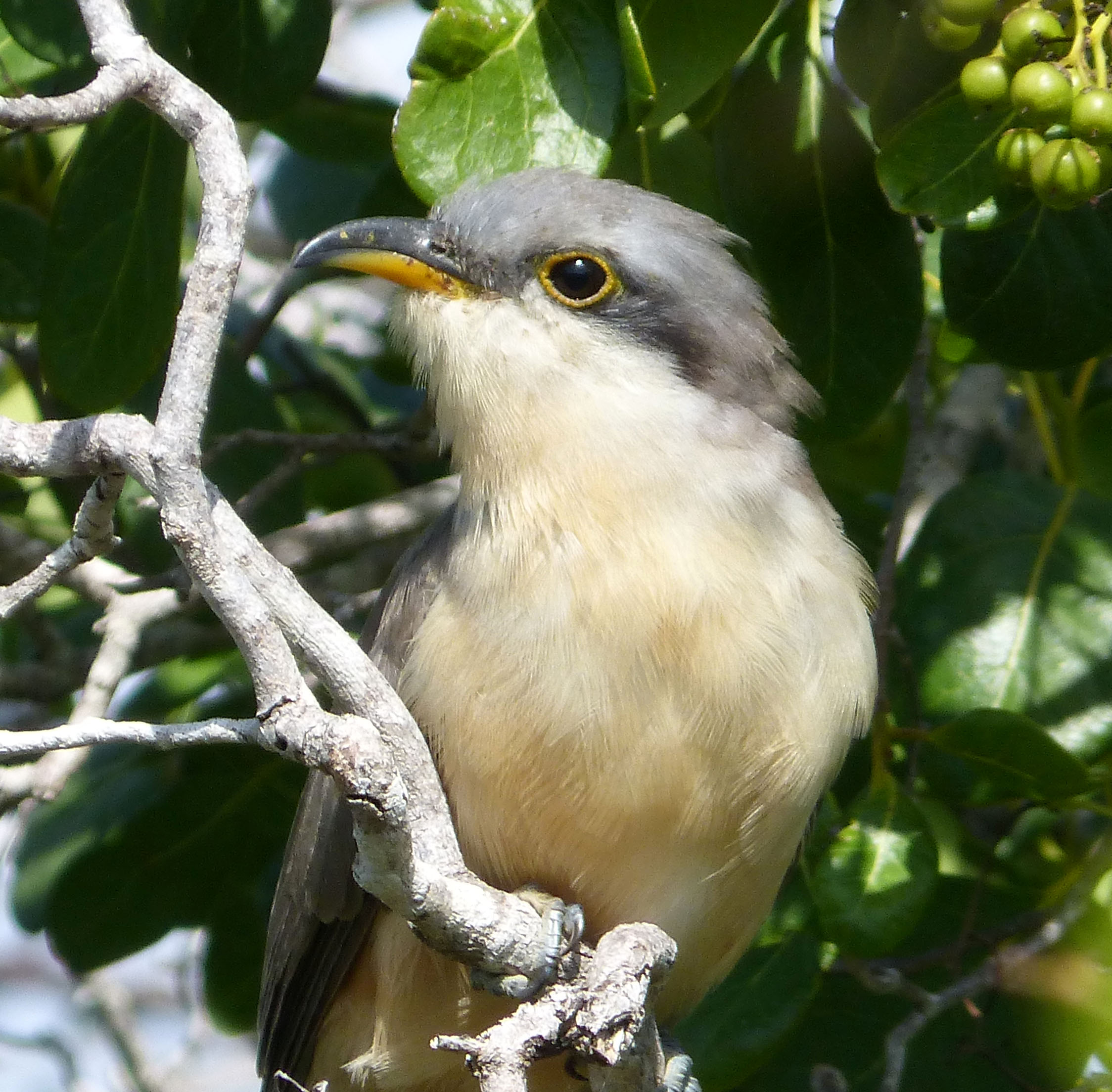
Mangrove cuckoo

Order: Cuculiformes Family: Cuculidae

The family Cuculidae includes cuckoos, roadrunners, and anis. These birds are of variable size with slender bodies, long tails, and strong legs.

- Greater ani, Crotophaga major (A)
- Smooth-billed ani, Crotophaga ani
- Groove-billed ani, Crotophaga sulcirostris
- Dark-billed cuckoo, Coccyzus melacoryphus (A)
- Yellow-billed cuckoo, Coccyzus americanus
- Mangrove cuckoo, Coccyzus minor
- Black-billed cuckoo, Coccyzus erythropthalmus

== Nightjars and allies ==
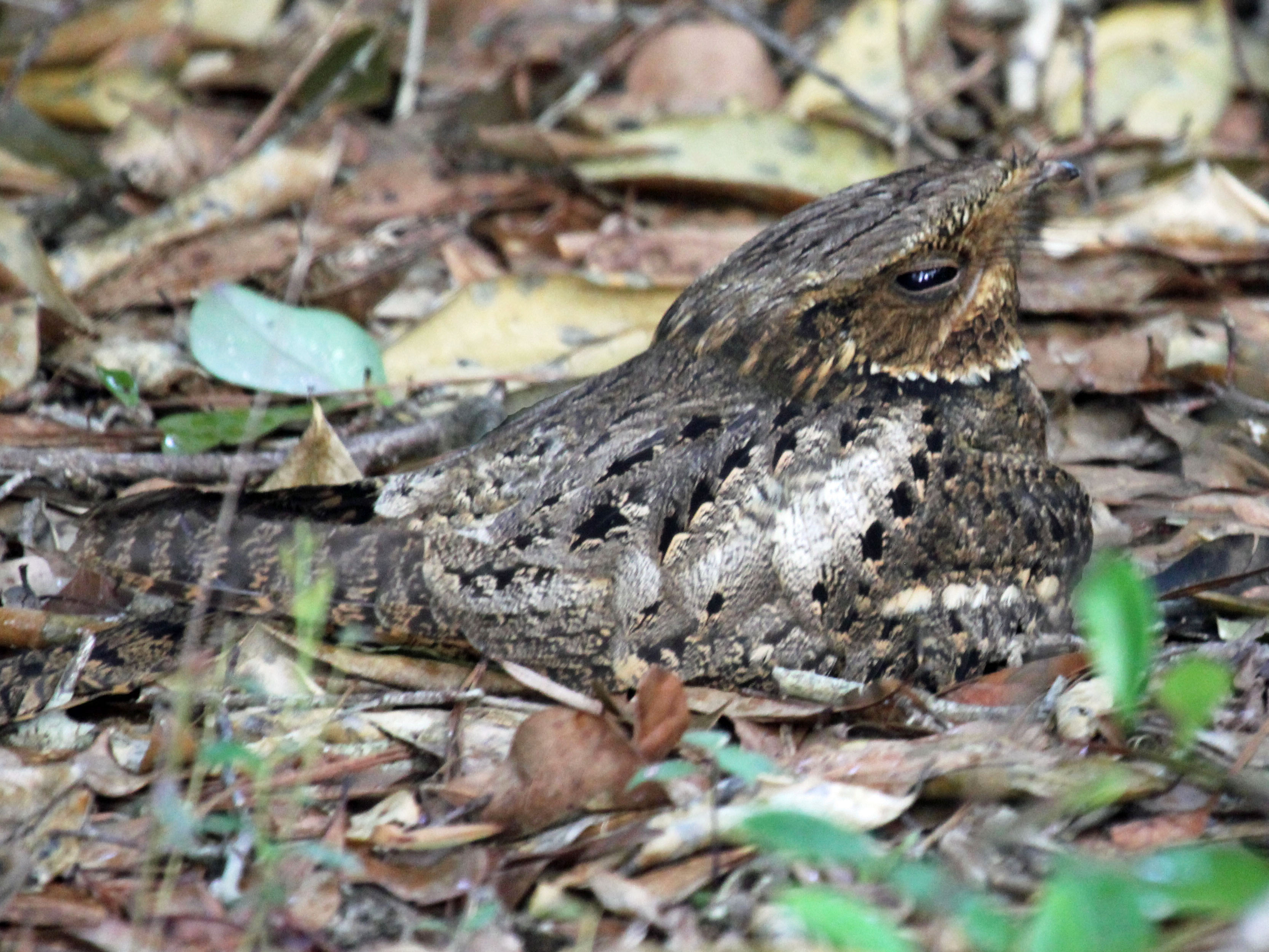
Chuck-will's-widow

Order: Caprimulgiformes Family: Caprimulgidae

Nightjars are medium-sized nocturnal birds that usually nest on the ground. They have long wings, short legs, and very short bills. Most have small feet, of little use for walking, and long pointed wings. Their soft plumage is cryptically colored to resemble bark or leaves.

- Lesser nighthawk, Chordeiles acutipennis
- Common nighthawk, Chordeiles minor
- Antillean nighthawk, Chordeiles gundlachii
- Common pauraque, Nyctidromus albicollis (A)
- Common poorwill, Phalaenoptilus nuttallii (A)
- Chuck-will's-widow, Antrostomus carolinensis
- Eastern whip-poor-will, Antrostomus vociferus

== Potoos ==
Order: Nyctibiiformes Family: Nyctibiidae

The potoos (sometimes called poor-me-ones) are large near passerine birds related to the nightjars and frogmouths. They are nocturnal insectivores which lack the bristles around the mouth found in the true nightjars.

- Common potoo, Nyctibius griseus (A?)

== Swifts ==
Order: Apodiformes Family: Apodidae

The swifts are small birds, spending most of their lives flying. They have very short legs and never settle voluntarily on the ground, perching instead only on vertical surfaces. Many swifts have very long swept-back wings which resemble a crescent or boomerang.

- Black swift, Cypseloides niger (A)
- White-collared swift, Streptoprocne zonaris (A)
- Gray-rumped swift, Chaetura cinereiventris (A)
- Chimney swift, Chaetura pelagica
- Vaux's swift, Chaetura vauxi (A)
- White-throated swift, Aeronautes saxatalis (A)
- Antillean palm-swift, Tachornis phoenicobia (A)

== Hummingbirds ==
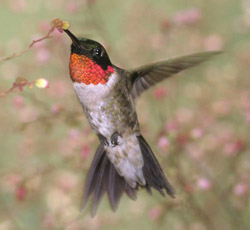
Ruby-throated hummingbird

Order: Apodiformes Family: Trochilidae

Hummingbirds are small birds capable of hovering in mid-air due to the rapid flapping of their wings. They are the only birds that can fly backwards.

- Bahama woodstar, Calliphlox evelynae (A)
- Green-breasted mango, Anthracothorax prevostii (A)
- Black-throated mango, Anthracothorax nigricollis (hypothetical)
- Rivoli's hummingbird, Eugenes fulgens (A)
- Blue-throated mountain-gem, Lampornis clemenciae (A)
- Ruby-throated hummingbird, Archilochus colubris
- Black-chinned hummingbird, Archilochus alexandri
- Anna's hummingbird, Calypte anna (A)
- Costa's hummingbird, Calypte costae (A)
- Calliope hummingbird, Selasphorus calliope (A)
- Rufous hummingbird, Selasphorus rufus
- Allen's hummingbird, Selasphorus sasin (A)
- Broad-tailed hummingbird, Selasphorus platycercus (A)
- Broad-billed hummingbird, Cynanthus latirostris (A)
- Cuban emerald, Riccordia ricordii (A)
- White-eared hummingbird, Basilinna leucotis (A)
- Antillean crested hummingbird, Orthorhyncus cristatus (A)
- Buff-bellied hummingbird, Amazila yucatanensis

== Rails, gallinules, and coots ==
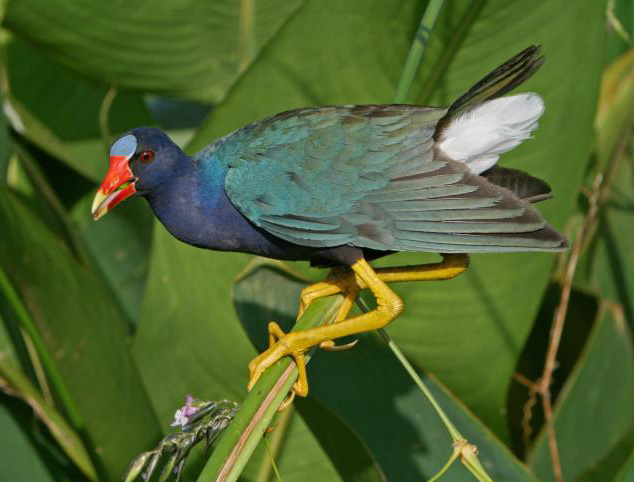
Purple gallinule

Order: Gruiformes Family: Rallidae

The Rallidae is a large family of small to medium-sized birds which includes the rails, crakes, coots, and gallinules. The most typical family members occupy dense vegetation in damp environments near lakes, swamps, or rivers. In general they are shy and secretive, making them difficult to observe. Most have strong legs with long toes, short rounded wings, and are weak fliers.

- Gray-cowled wood-rail, Aramides cajaneus (e)
- Clapper rail, Rallus crepitans
- King rail, Rallus elegans
- Virginia rail, Rallus limicola
- Sora, Porzana carolina
- Common gallinule, Gallinula galeata
- American coot, Fulica americana
- Purple gallinule, Porphyrio martinicus
- Purple swamphen, Porphyrio poliocephalus (I)
- Yellow rail, Coturnicops noveboracensis (A)
- Black rail, Laterallus jamaicensis

== Limpkin ==
Order: Gruiformes Family: Aramidae

The limpkin is an odd bird that looks like a large rail, but is skeletally closer to the cranes. It is found in marshes with some trees or scrub in the Caribbean, South America, and southern Florida.

- Limpkin, Aramus guarauna

== Cranes ==
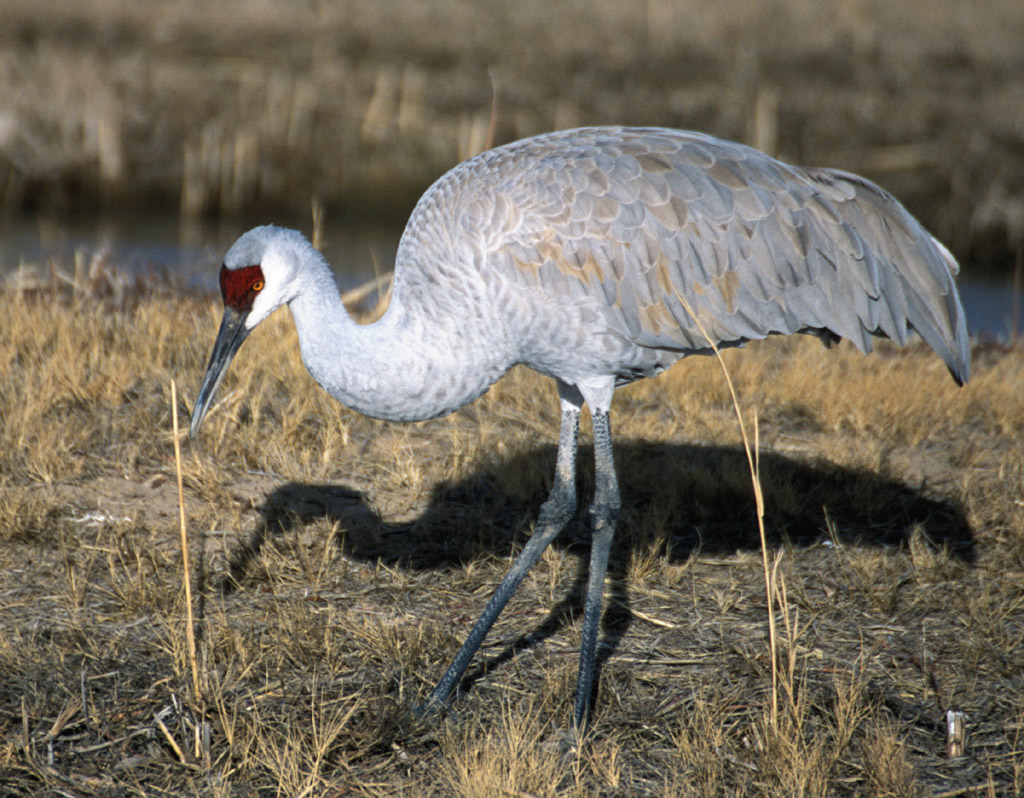
Sandhill crane

Order: Gruiformes Family: Gruidae

Cranes are large, tall birds with long legs and long necks. Unlike the similar-looking but un-related herons, cranes fly with necks extended. Most have elaborate and noisy courtship displays or "dances". When in a group, they may also "dance" for no particular reason, jumping up and down in an elegant manner, seemingly just for pleasure or to attract a mate.

- Sandhill crane, Antigone canadensis
- Whooping crane, Grus americana (reintroduced) (Note: The former natural wild population is locally extinct; a non-migratory flock is now resident.)

== Stilts and avocets ==
Order: Charadriiformes Family: Recurvirostridae

Recurvirostridae is a family of large wading birds which includes the avocets and stilts. The avocets have long legs and long up-curved bills. The stilts have extremely long legs and long, thin, straight bills.

- Black-necked stilt, Himantopus mexicanus
- American avocet, Recurvirostra americana

== Oystercatchers ==
Order: Charadriiformes Family: Haematopodidae

The oystercatchers are large, conspicuous, and noisy plover-like birds, with strong bills used for smashing or prising open molluscs.

- American oystercatcher, Haematopus palliatus
- Black oystercatcher, Haematopus bachmani (A)

== Lapwings and plovers ==
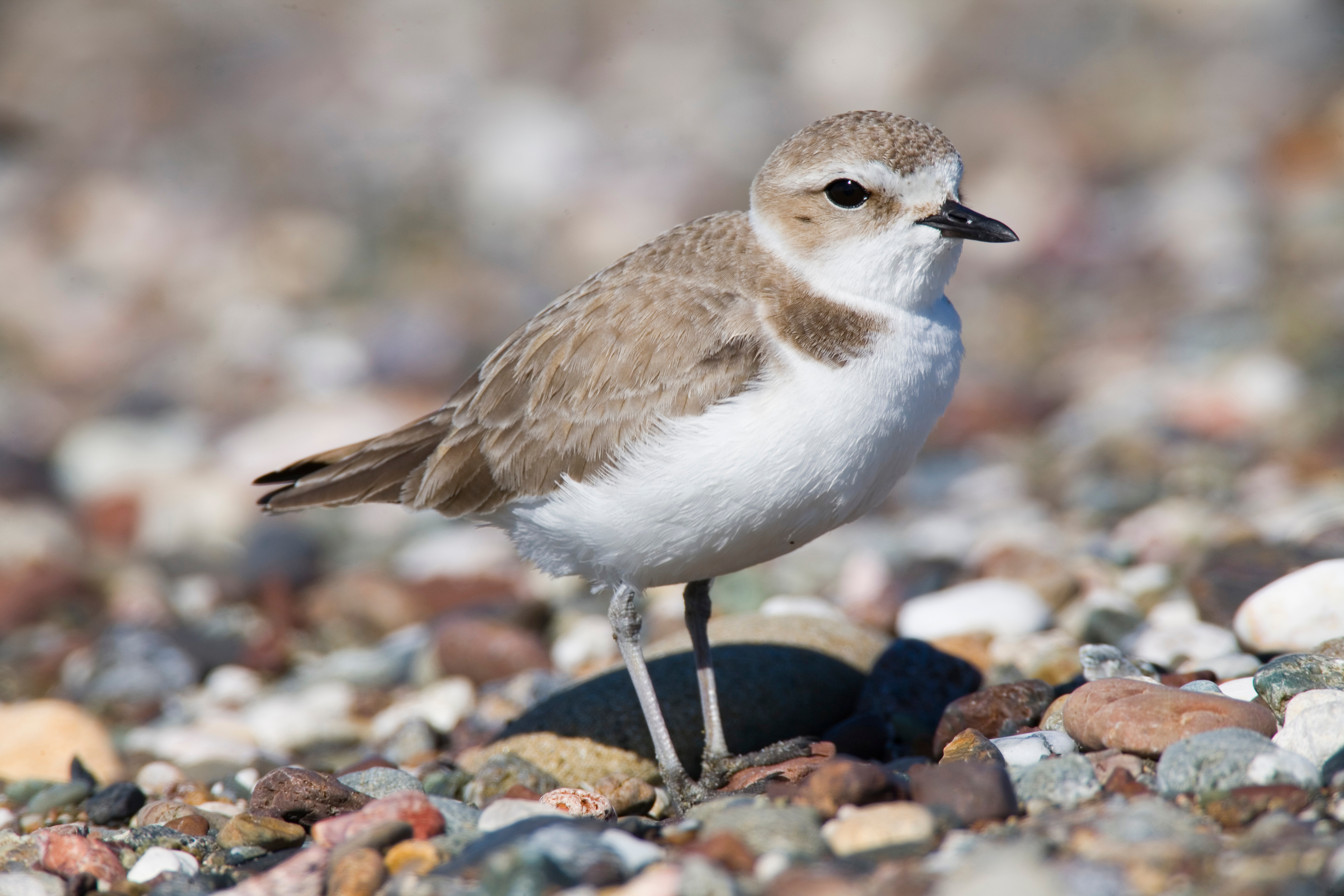
Snowy plover

Order: Charadriiformes Family: Charadriidae

The family Charadriidae includes the plovers, dotterels, and lapwings. They are small to medium-sized birds with compact bodies, short thick necks, and long, usually pointed, wings. They are generally found in open country, mostly in habitats near water.

- Northern lapwing, Vanellus vanellus (A)
- Southern lapwing, Vanellus chilensis (A)
- Black-bellied plover, Pluvialis squatarola
- American golden-plover, Pluviali dominicas
- Pacific golden-plover, Pluvialis fulva (A)
- Killdeer, Charadrius vociferus
- Semipalmated plover, Charadrius semipalmatus
- Piping plover, Charadrius melodus
- Lesser sand-plover, Charadrius mongolus (A)
- Greater sand-plover, Charadrius leschenaultii (A)
- Wilson's plover, Charadrius wilsonia
- Collared plover, Charadrius collaris (A)
- Snowy plover, Charadrius nivosus
- Mountain plover, Charadrius montanus (A)

== Jacanas ==
Order: Charadriiformes Family: Jacanidae

The jacanas are a family of waders found worldwide within the tropical zone. They are identifiable by their huge feet and claws which enable them to walk on floating vegetation in the shallow lakes that are their preferred habitat.

- Northern jacana, Jacana spinosa (A)

== Sandpipers and allies ==
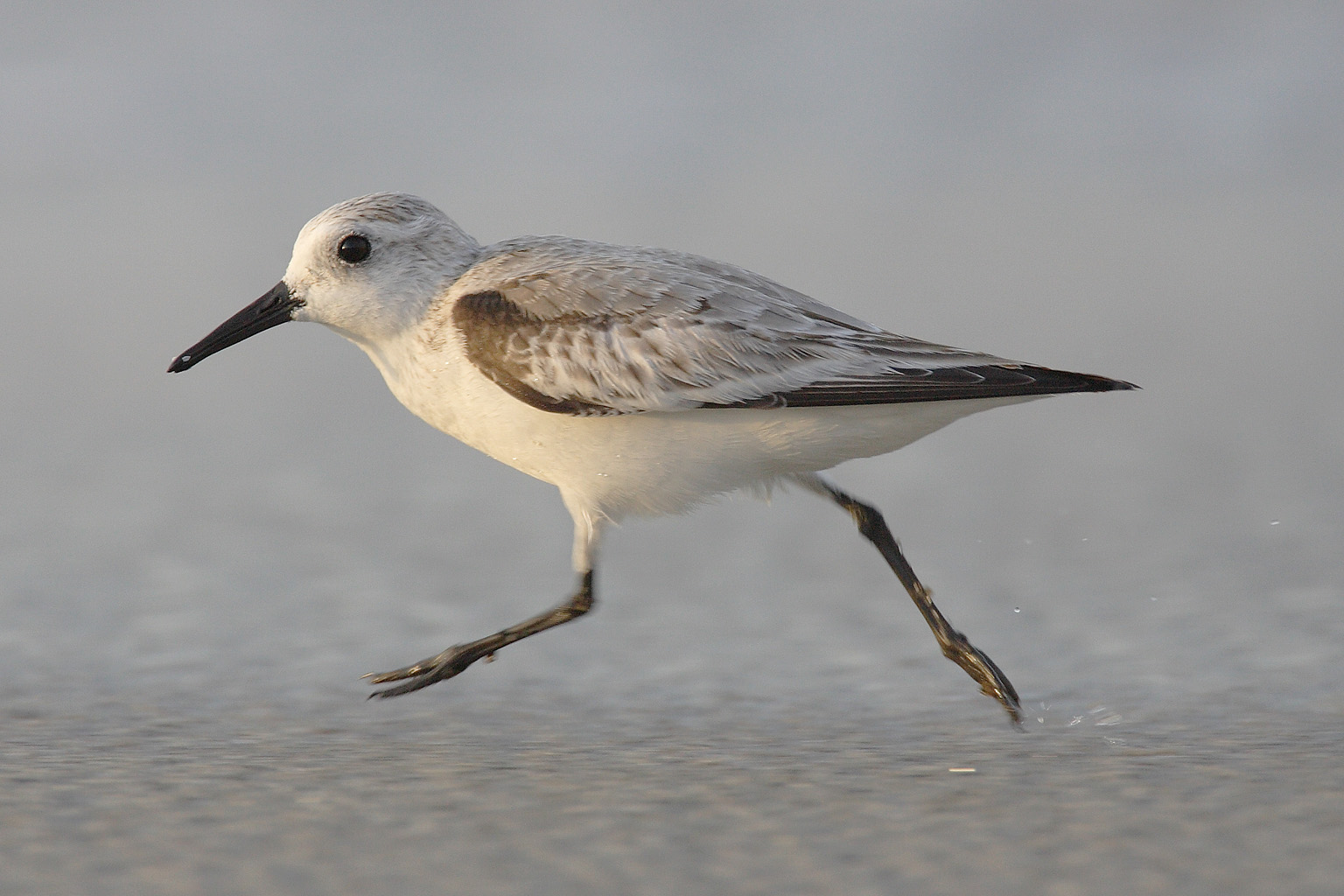
Sanderling

Order: Charadriiformes Family: Scolopacidae

Scolopacidae is a large and diverse family of small to medium-sized shorebirds which includes the sandpipers, curlews, godwits, shanks, tattlers, woodcocks, snipes, dowitchers, and phalaropes. Most eat small invertebrates picked out of the mud or sand. Different lengths of legs and bills enable multiple species to feed in the same habitat, particularly on the coast, without direct competition for food.

- Upland sandpiper, Bartramia longicauda
- Whimbrel, Numenius phaeopus
- Long-billed curlew, Numenius americanus
- Eurasian curlew, Numenius arquata (A)
- Bar-tailed godwit, Limosa lapponica (A)
- Black-tailed godwit, Limosa limosa (A)
- Hudsonian godwit, Limosa haemastica
- Marbled godwit, Limosa fedoa
- Ruddy turnstone, Arenaria interpres
- Red knot, Calidris canutus
- Surfbird, Calidris virgata (A)
- Ruff, Calidris pugnax
- Sharp-tailed sandpiper, Calidris acuminata (A)
- Stilt sandpiper, Calidris himantopus
- Curlew sandpiper, Calidris ferruginea (A)
- Red-necked stint, Calidris ruficollis (A)
- Sanderling, Calidris alba
- Dunlin, Calidris alpina
- Purple sandpiper, Calidris maritima
- Baird's sandpiper, Calidris bairdii
- Little stint, Calidris minuta (A)
- Least sandpiper, Calidris minutilla
- White-rumped sandpiper, Calidris fuscicollis
- Buff-breasted sandpiper, Calidris subruficollis
- Pectoral sandpiper, Calidris melanotos
- Semipalmated sandpiper, Calidris pusilla
- Western sandpiper, Calidris mauri
- Short-billed dowitcher, Limnodromus griseus
- Long-billed dowitcher, Limnodromus scolopaceus
- American woodcock, Scolopax minor
- Wilson's snipe, Gallinago delicata
- Spotted sandpiper, Actitis macularius
- Solitary sandpiper, Tringa solitaria
- Gray-tailed tattler, Tringa brevipes (A)
- Lesser yellowlegs, Tringa flavipes
- Willet, Tringa semipalmata
- Spotted redshank, Tringa erythropus (A)
- Common greenshank, Tringa nebularia (A)
- Greater yellowlegs, Tringa melanoleuca
- Wilson's phalarope, Phalaropus tricolor
- Red-necked phalarope, Phalaropus lobatus
- Red phalarope, Phalaropus fulicarius

== Skuas and jaegers ==
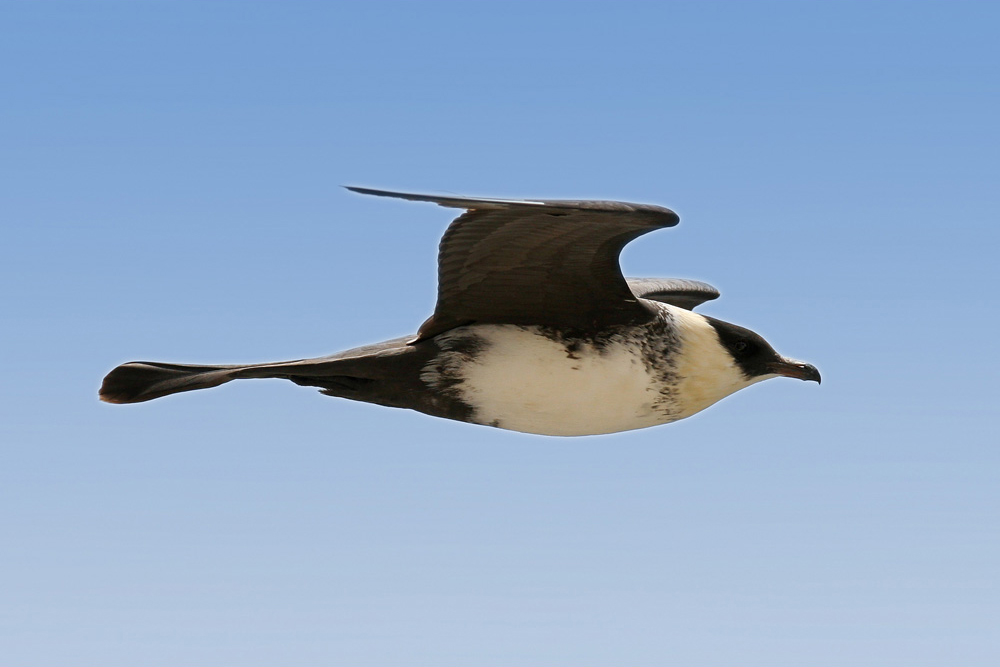
Pomarine jaeger

Order: Charadriiformes Family: Stercorariidae

Skuas are medium to large seabirds, typically with gray or brown plumage, often with white markings on the wings. They have longish bills with hooked tips and webbed feet with sharp claws. They look like large dark gulls, but have a fleshy cere above the upper mandible. They are strong, acrobatic fliers.

- South polar skua, Stercorarius maccormicki (A)
- Pomarine jaeger, Stercorarius pomarinus
- Parasitic jaeger, Stercorarius parasiticus
- Long-tailed jaeger, Stercorarius longicaudus

== Auks, murres, and puffins ==
Order: Charadriiformes Family: Alcidae

Alcids are superficially similar to penguins due to their black-and-white colors, their upright posture, and some of their habits; however they are not closely related to penguins and are (with one extinct exception) able to fly. Auks live on the open sea, only deliberately coming ashore to breed.

- Dovekie, Alle alle (A)
- Common murre, Uria aalge (A)
- Thick-billed murre, Uria lomvia (A)
- Razorbill, Alca torda
- Great auk, Pinguinus impennis (E)
- Black guillemot, Cepphus grylle (A)
- Long-billed murrelet, Brachyrampus perdix (A)
- Marbled murrelet, Brachyramphus marmoratus (A)
- Ancient murrelet, Synthliboramphus antiquus (A)
- Atlantic puffin, Fratercula arctica (A)

== Gulls, terns, and skimmers ==
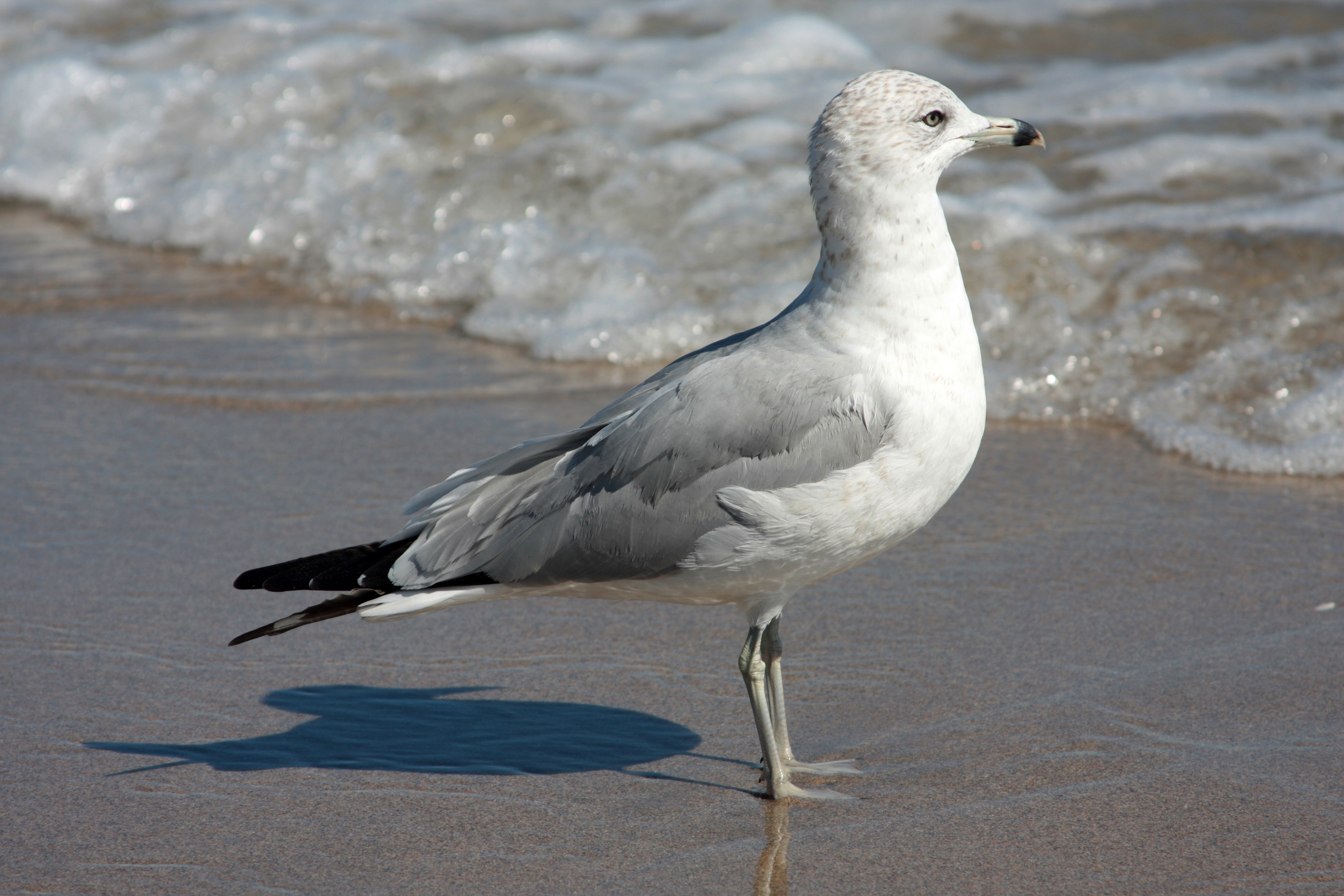
Ring-billed gull

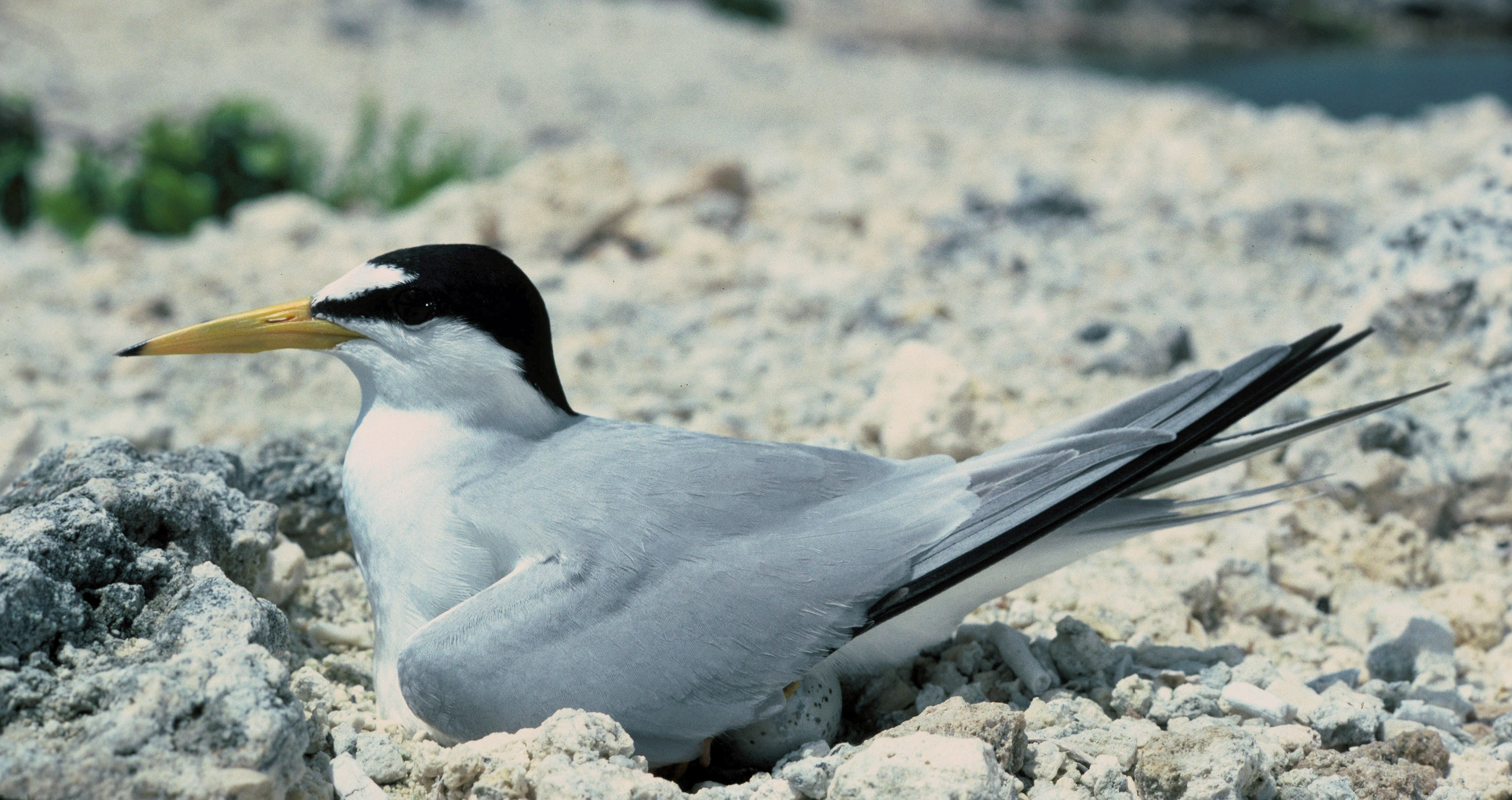
Least tern

Order: Charadriiformes Family: Laridae

The Laridae are a family of medium to large seabirds and containing the gulls, terns, kittiwakes, and skimmers. They are typically gray or white, often with black markings on the head or wings. They have stout, longish bills and webbed feet.

- Black-legged kittiwake, Rissa tridactyla (A)
- Sabine's gull, Xema sabini
- Bonaparte's gull, Chroicocephalus philadelphia
- Gray-hooded gull, Chroicocephalus cirrocephhalus (A)
- Black-headed gull, Chroicocephalus ridibundus (A)
- Little gull, Hydrocoleus minutus (A)
- Laughing gull, Leucophaeus atricilla
- Gray gull, Leucophaeus modestus (A)
- Franklin's gull, Leucophaeus pipixcan
- Audouin's gull, Ichthyaetus audouinii (A) (not on the AOS Check-list)
- Belcher's gull, Larus belcheri (A)
- Black-tailed gull, Larus crassirostris (A)
- Heermann's gull, Larus heermanni (A)
- Common gull, Larus canus (A)
- Ring-billed gull, Larus delawarensis
- California gull, Larus californicus (A)
- American herring gull, Larus smithsonianus
- European herring gull, Larus argentatus (A)
  - "Vega gull", L. a. vega (A)
- Iceland gull, Larus glaucoides
  - "Nominate Iceland gull", L. g. glaucoides (A)
  - Thayer's gull, L. g. thayeri (A)
- Yellow-legged gull, Larus michahellis (A)
- Lesser black-backed gull, Larus fuscus
- Slaty-backed gull, Larus schistisagus (A)
- Glaucous-winged gull, Larus glaucescens (A)
- Glaucous gull, Larus hyperboreus
- Great black-backed gull, Larus marinus
- Kelp gull, Larus dominicanus (A)
- Brown noddy, Anous stolidus
- Black noddy, Anous minutus
- Sooty tern, Onychoprion fuscata
- Bridled tern, Onychoprion anaethetus
- Least tern, Sternula antillarum
- Gull-billed tern, Gelochelidon nilotica
- Caspian tern, Hydroprogne caspia
- White-winged tern, Chlidonias leucopterus (A)
- Whiskered tern, Chlidonias hybrida (A)
- Black tern, Chlidonias niger
- Large-billed tern, Phaetusa simplex (A)
- Roseate tern, Sterna dougallii
- Common tern, Sterna hirundo
- Arctic tern, Sterna paradisaea
- Forster's tern, Sterna forsteri
- Royal tern, Thalasseus maxima
- Sandwich tern, Thalasseus sandvicensis
  - "Cayenne tern", T. s. eurygnathus (A)
- Elegant tern, Thalasseus elegans (A)
- West African crested tern, Thalasseus albididorsalis (A) (not on the AOS Check-list)
- Black skimmer, Rynchops niger

== Tropicbirds ==
Order: Phaethontiformes Family: Phaethontidae

Tropicbirds are slender white birds of tropical oceans with exceptionally long central tail feathers. Their long wings have black markings, as does the head.

- White-tailed tropicbird, Phaethon lepturus
- Red-billed tropicbird, Phaeton aethereus (A)

== Loons ==
Order: Gaviiformes Family: Gaviidae

Loons are aquatic birds the size of a large duck, to which they are unrelated. Their plumage is largely gray or black and they have spear-shaped bills. Loons swim well and fly adequately but, because their legs are placed towards the rear of the body, are clumsy on land.

- Red-throated loon, Gavia stellata
- Arctic loon, Gavia arctica (A)
- Pacific loon, Gavia pacifica (A)
- Common loon, Gavia immer
- Yellow-billed loon, Gavia adamsii (A)

== Albatrosses ==
Order: Procellariiformes Family: Diomedeidae

Albatrosses are among the largest of flying birds, and the great albatrosses from the genus Diomedea have the largest wingspans of any extant birds.

- Yellow-nosed albatross, Thalassarche chlororhynchos (A)
- Black-browed albatross, Thalassarche melanophris (A)
- Wandering albatross, Diomedea exulans (hypothetical)

== Southern storm-petrels ==
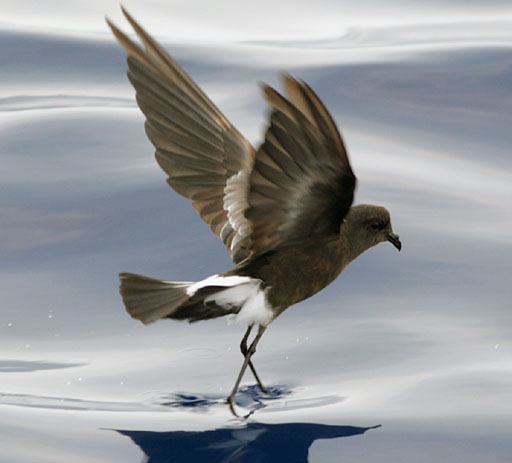
Wilson's storm-petrel

Order: Procellariiformes Family: Oceanitidae

The storm-petrels are the smallest seabirds, relatives of the petrels, feeding on planktonic crustaceans and small fish picked from the surface, typically while hovering. The flight is fluttering and sometimes bat-like. Until 2018, this family's three species were included with the other storm-petrels in family Hydrobatidae.

- Wilson's storm-petrel, Oceanites oceanicus
- White-bellied storm-petrel, Fregetta grallaria (A) (not on the AOS Check-list)

== Northern storm-petrels ==
Order: Procellariiformes Family: Hydrobatidae

Though the members of this family are similar in many respects to the southern storm-petrels, including their general appearance and habits, there are enough genetic differences to warrant their placement in a separate family.

- European storm-petrel, Hydrobates pelagicus (A)
- Leach's storm-petrel, Hydrobates leucorhous
- Band-rumped storm-petrel, Hydrobates castro

== Shearwaters and petrels ==
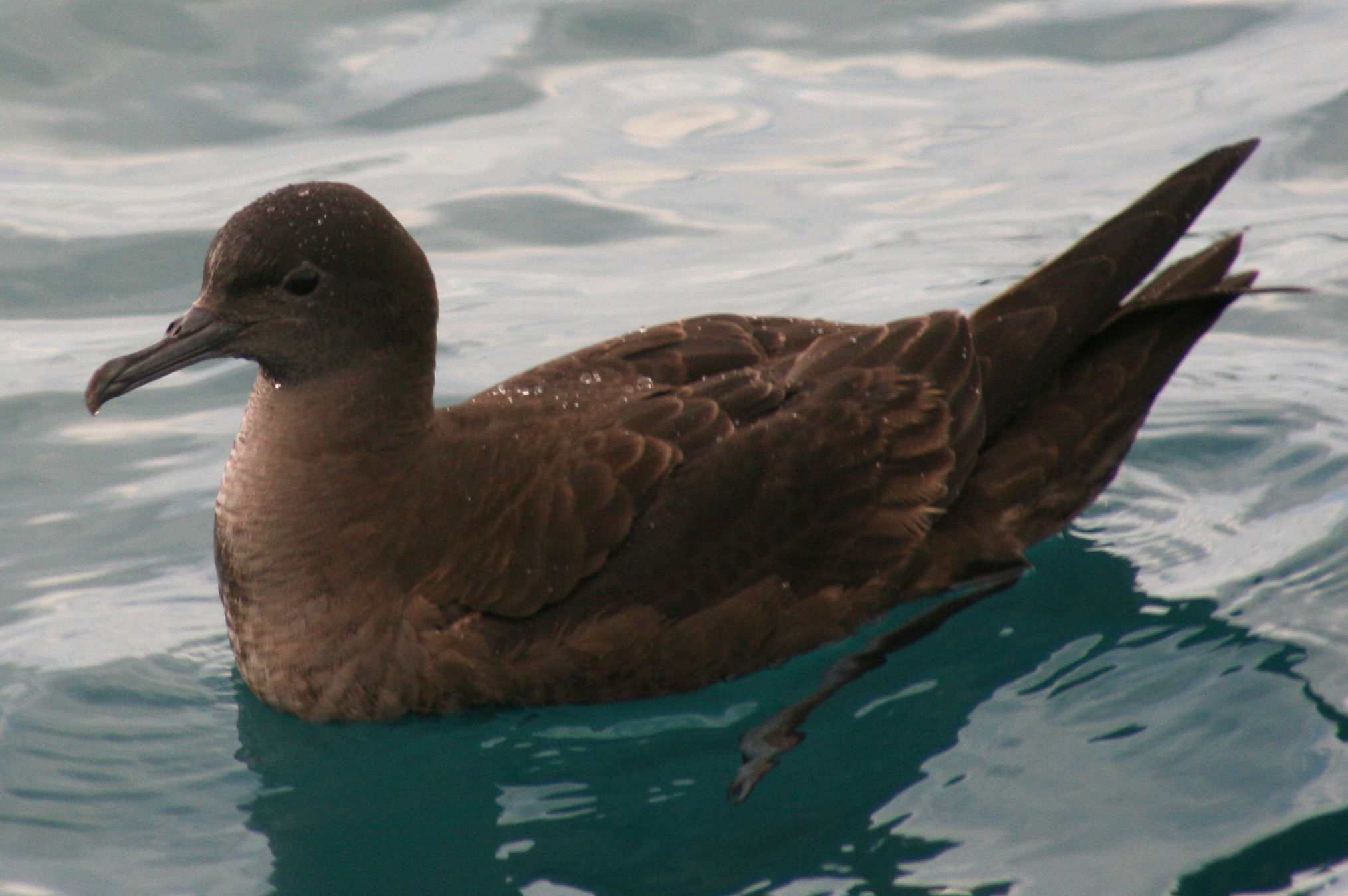
Sooty shearwater

Order: Procellariiformes Family: Procellariidae

The procellariids are the main group of medium-sized "true petrels", characterized by united tubular nostrils with a median septum.

- Northern fulmar, Fulmarus glacialis (A)
- Bermuda petrel, Pterodroma cahow (A)
- Black-capped petrel, Pterodoma hasitata
- Fea's petrel, Pterodroma feae (A)
- Bulwer's petrel, Bulweria bulwerii (A)
- Cory's shearwater, Calonectris diomedea
- Cape Verde shearwater, Calonectris edwardsii (A)
- Wedge-tailed shearwater, Ardenna pacifica (A)
- Short-tailed shearwater, Ardenna tenuirostris (A)
- Sooty shearwater, Ardenna griseus
- Great shearwater, Ardenna gravis
- Manx shearwater, Puffinus puffinus (A)
- Sargasso shearwater, Puffinus lherminieri

== Storks ==
Order: Ciconiiformes Family: Ciconiidae

Storks are large, heavy, long-legged, long-necked wading birds with long stout bills and wide wingspans. They lack the powder down that other wading birds such as herons, spoonbills and ibises use to clean off fish slime. Storks lack a pharynx and are mute.

- White stork, Ciconia ciconia (A) (not on the AOS Check-list)
- Jabiru, Jabiru mycteria (e)
- Wood stork, Mycteria americana

== Frigatebirds ==
Order: Suliformes Family: Fregatidae

Frigatebirds are large seabirds usually found over tropical oceans. They are large, black, or black-and-white, with long wings and deeply forked tails. The males have colored inflatable throat pouches. They do not swim or walk and cannot take off from a flat surface. Having the largest wingspan-to-body-weight ratio of any bird, they are essentially aerial, able to stay aloft for more than a week.

- Magnificent frigatebird, Fregata magnificens

== Boobies and gannets ==
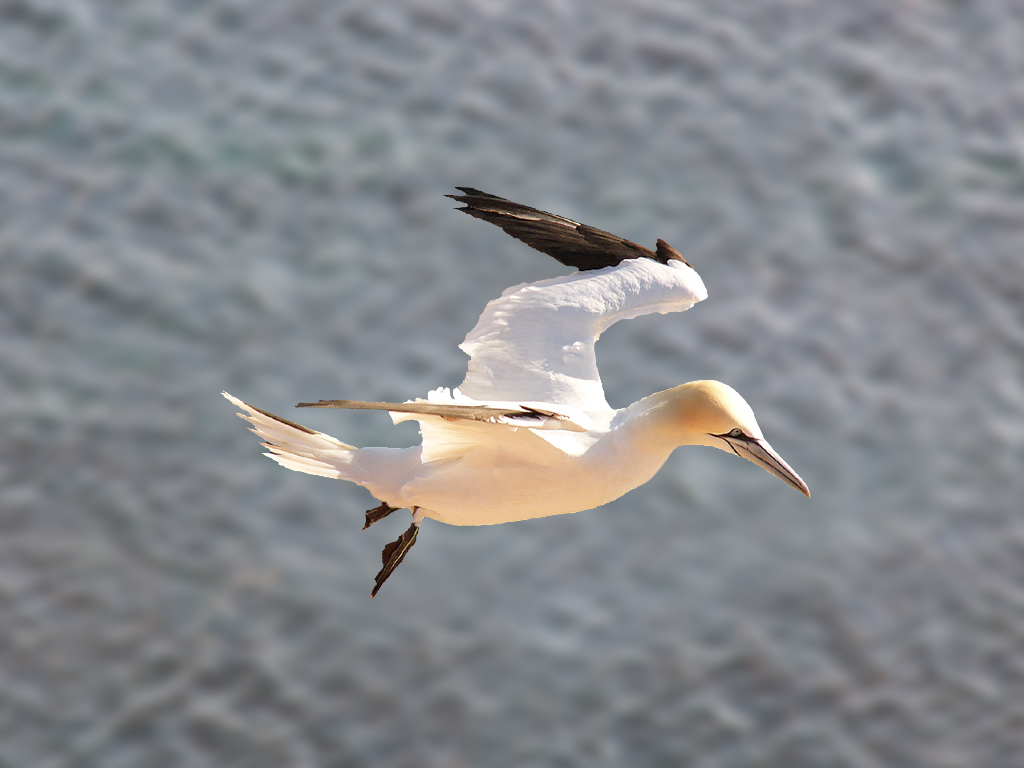
Northern gannet

Order: Suliformes Family: Sulidae

The sulids comprise the gannets and boobies. Both groups are medium-large coastal seabirds that plunge-dive for fish.

- Masked booby, Sula dactylatra
- Blue-footed booby, Sula nebouxii (A)
- Peruvian booby, Sula variegata (A)
- Brown booby, Sula leucogaster
- Red-footed booby, Sula sula (A)
- Northern gannet, Morus bassanus

== Anhingas ==
Order: Suliformes Family: Anhingidae

Anhingas, also known as darters or snakebirds, are cormorant-like water birds with long necks and long, straight beaks. They are fish eaters, diving for long periods, and often swim with only their neck above the water, looking rather like a water snake.

- Anhinga, Anhinga anhinga

== Cormorants and shags ==
Order: Suliformes Family: Phalacrocoracidae

Cormorants are medium-to-large aquatic birds, usually with mainly dark plumage and areas of colored skin on the face. The bill is long, thin, and sharply hooked. Their feet are four-toed and webbed.

- Great cormorant, Phalacrocorax carbo
- Double-crested cormorant, Nannopterum auritum
- Neotropic cormorant, Nannopterum brasilianum

== Pelicans ==
Order: Pelecaniformes Family: Pelecanidae

Pelicans are very large water birds with a distinctive pouch under their beak. Like other birds in the order Pelecaniformes, they have four webbed toes.

- American white pelican, Pelecanus erythrorhynchos
- Brown pelican, Pelecanus occidentalis
- Great white pelican, Pelecanus onocrotalus (A) (not on the AOS Check-list)

== Herons, egrets, and bitterns ==
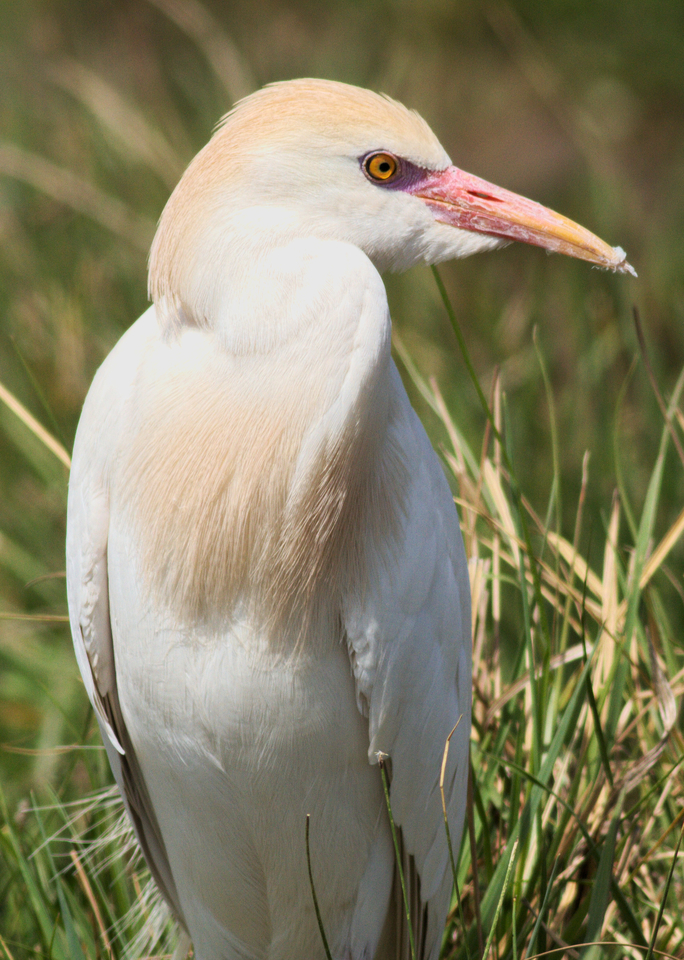
Cattle egret

Order: Pelecaniformes Family: Ardeidae

The family Ardeidae contains the herons, egrets, and bitterns. Herons and egrets are wading birds with long necks and legs. Herons are large and egrets are smaller. The cattle egret or "cow bird" is seen amongst flocks of cattle, for instance in ranches north of the Everglades. A bird will often attach itself to a particular bull, cow or calf, even being tolerated perching on the back or even the head of the animal. The birds are more shy than the animals, and will fly away if approached. The birds feed on various items turned over by the cattle as they graze and tramp the ground. Bitterns tend to be shorter necked and more secretive. Unlike other long-necked birds such as storks, ibises, and spoonbills, members of the Ardeidae fly with their necks pulled back into a curve.

- American bittern, Botaurus lentiginosus
- Least bittern, Ixobrychus exilis
- Great blue heron, Ardea herodias
- Gray heron, Ardea cinerea (A)
- Cocoi heron, Ardea cocoi (A)
- Purple heron, Ardea purpurea (A)
- Great egret, Ardea alba
- Whistling heron, Syrigma sibilatrix (A)
- Little egret, Egretta garzetta (A)
- Western reef-heron, Egretta gularis (A)
- Snowy egret, Egretta thula
- Little blue heron, Egretta caerulea
- Tricolored heron, Egretta tricolor
- Reddish egret, Egretta rufescens
- Cattle egret, Bubulcus ibis
- Green heron, Butorides virescens
- Striated heron, Butorides striata (A)
- Black-crowned night-heron, Nycticorax nycticorax
- Yellow-crowned night-heron, Nyctanassa violacea

== Ibises and spoonbills ==
Order: Pelecaniformes Family: Threskiornithidae

The family Threskiornithidae includes the ibises and spoonbills. They have long, broad wings. Their bodies are elongated, the neck more so, with long legs. The bill is also long, curved downward in the ibises, straight and markedly flattened in the spoonbills.

- White ibis, Eudocimus albus
- Scarlet ibis, Eudocimus ruber (A)
- Glossy ibis, Plegadis falcinellus
- White-faced ibis, Plegadis chihi
- Roseate spoonbill, Platalea ajaja
- Eurasian spoonbill, Platalea leucorodia (A)

== New World vultures ==
Order: Cathartiformes Family: Cathartidae

New World vultures are not closely related to Old World vultures, but superficially resemble them because of convergent evolution. Like the Old World vultures, they are scavengers. Unlike Old World vultures, which find carcasses by sight, New World vultures have a good sense of smell with which they locate carcasses. The turkey vulture has a red head. The black vulture has a grey head. Although not a water bird, a flock of black vultures at the Myakka River State Park, southeast of Sarasota, has been seen bathing at the edge of the lake and then drying out their wings in the same way as cormorants like the Florida anhinga. This habit may help free them of parasites.

- King vulture, Sarcoramphus papa (A)
- Black vulture, Coragyps atratus
- Turkey vulture, Cathartes aura
- Lesser yellow-headed vulture, Cathartes burrovianus (A)
- Greater yellow-headed vulture, Cathartes melambrotus (A) (not on the AOS Check-list)

== Osprey ==
Order: Accipitriformes Family: Pandionidae

Pandionidae is a family of fish-eating birds of prey possessing a very large, powerful hooked beak for tearing flesh from their prey, strong legs, powerful talons, and keen eyesight. The family is monotypic.

- Osprey, Pandion haliaetus

== Hawks, eagles, and kites ==
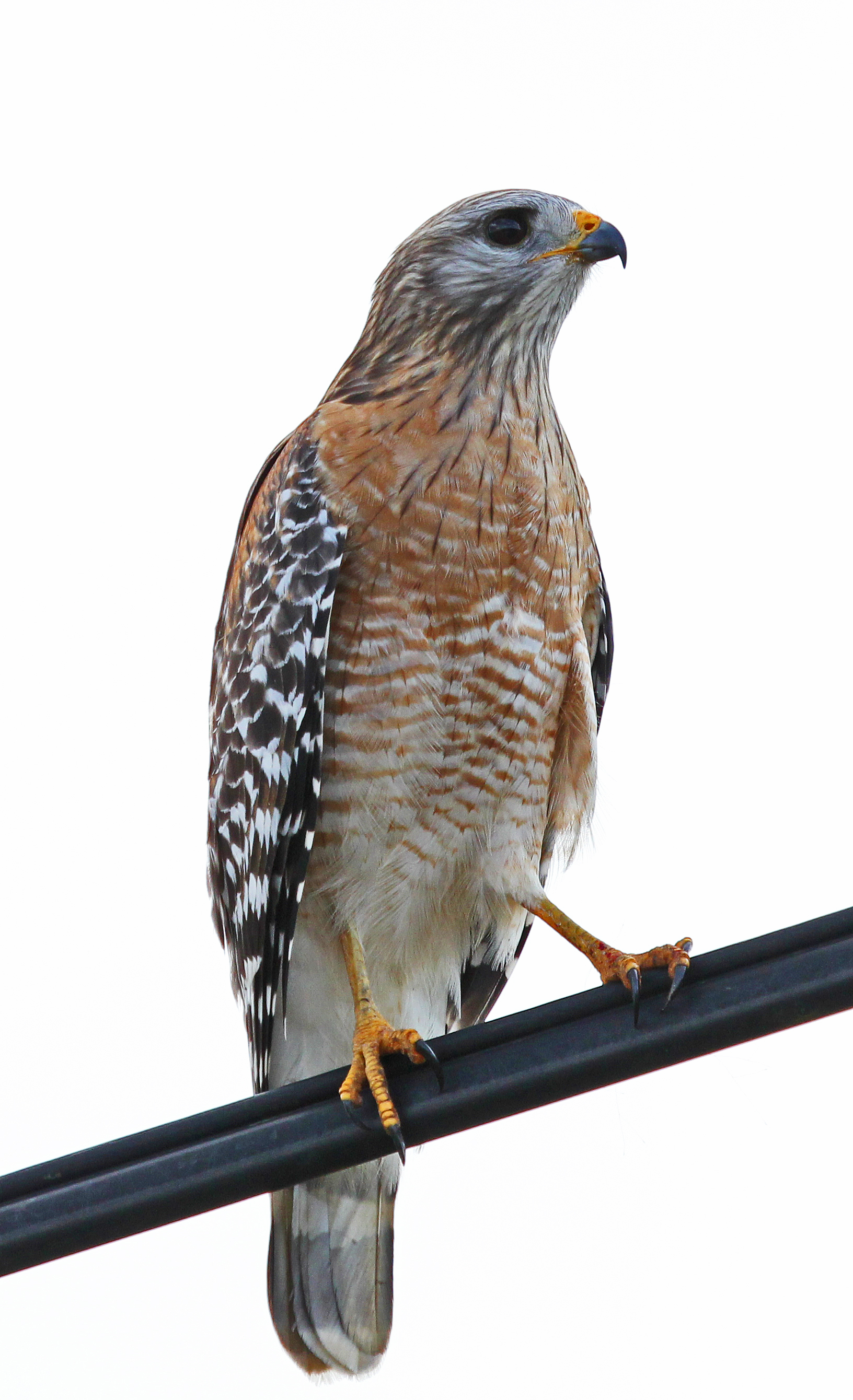
Red-shouldered hawk

Order: Accipitriformes Family: Accipitridae

Accipitridae is a family of birds of prey that includes hawks, eagles, kites, harriers, and Old World vultures. They have very large, hooked beaks for tearing flesh from their prey, strong legs, powerful talons, and keen eyesight.

- White-tailed kite, Elanus leucurus
- Swallow-tailed kite, Elanoides forficatus
- Golden eagle, Aquila chrysaetos (A)
- Double-toothed kite, Harpagus bidentatus (A)
- Northern harrier, Circus hudsonius
- Sharp-shinned hawk, Accipiter striatus
- Cooper's hawk, Accipiter cooperii
- American goshawk, Accipiter atricapillus (A)
- Gundlach's hawk, Accipiter gundlachi (A)
- Black kite, Milvus migrans (A)
- Bald eagle, Haliaeetus leucocephalus
- Steller's sea-eagle, Haliaeetus pelagicus (A)
- White-tailed eagle, Haliaeetus albicilla (A)
- Mississippi kite, Ictinia mississippiensis
- Snail kite, Rostrhamus sociabilis
- Great black hawk, Buteogallus urubitinga (A)
- Roadside hawk, Rupornis magnirostris (A)
- Harris's hawk, Parabuteo unicinctus (A)
- Red-shouldered hawk, Buteo lineatus
- Gray-lined hawk, Buteo nitidus (A)
- Broad-winged hawk, Buteo platypterus
- Short-tailed hawk, Buteo brachyurus
- Swainson's hawk, Buteo swainsoni
- Zone-tailed hawk, Buteo albonotatus (A)
- Red-tailed hawk, Buteo jamaicensis
  - Harlan's hawk, B. j. harlani
- Rough-legged hawk, Buteo lagopus (A)
- Ferruginous hawk, Buteo regalis (A)

== Barn-owls ==
Order: Strigiformes Family: Tytonidae

Barn-owls are medium to large owls with large heads and characteristic heart-shaped faces. They have long strong legs with powerful talons.

- Barn owl, Tyto alba

== Owls ==
Order: Strigiformes Family: Strigidae

Typical owls are small to large solitary nocturnal birds of prey. They have large forward-facing eyes and ears, a hawk-like beak, and a conspicuous circle of feathers around each eye called a facial disk.

- Flammulated owl, Psiloscops flammeolus (A)
- Western screech-owl, Megascops kennicottii (A)
- Eastern screech-owl, Megascops asio
- Great horned owl, Bubo virginianus
- Snowy owl, Bubo scandiacus (A)
- Burrowing owl, Athene cunicularia
- Great gray owl, Strix nebulosa (A)
- Barred owl, Strix varia
- Long-eared owl, Asio otus (A)
- Stygian owl, Asio stygius (A)
- Short-eared owl, Asio flammeus
- Northern saw-whet owl, Aegolius acadicus (A)

== Kingfishers ==
Order: Coraciiformes Family: Alcedinidae

Kingfishers are medium-sized birds with large heads, long pointed bills, short legs, and stubby tails.

- Ringed kingfisher, Megaceryle torquata (A)
- Belted kingfisher, Megaceryle alcyon

== Woodpeckers ==
Three-dimensional video of a male American ivory-billed woodpecker specimen, Naturalis Biodiversity Center

Order: Piciformes Family: Picidae

Woodpeckers are small to medium-sized birds with chisel-like beaks, short legs, stiff tails, and long tongues used for capturing insects. Some species have feet with two toes pointing forward and two backward, while several species have only three toes. Many woodpeckers have the habit of tapping noisily on tree trunks with their beaks.

- Red-headed woodpecker, Melanerpes erythrocephalus
- Gila woodpecker, Melanerpes uropygialis (A?)
- Golden-fronted woodpecker, Melanerpes aurifrons (A)
- Red-bellied woodpecker, Melanerpes carolinus
- Williamson's sapsucker, Sphyrapicus thyroideus (A)
- Yellow-bellied sapsucker, Sphyrapicus varius
- Red-naped sapsucker, Sphyrapicus nuchalis (A)
- Red-breasted sapsucker, Sphyrapicus ruber (A)
- Black-backed woodpecker, Picoides arcticus (A)
- Downy woodpecker, Dryobates pubescens
- Nuttall's woodpecker, Dryobates nuttallii (A)
- Red-cockaded woodpecker, Dryobates borealis
- Hairy woodpecker, Dryobates villosus
- Northern flicker, Colaptes auratus
- Pileated woodpecker, Dryocopus pileatus
- Ivory-billed woodpecker, Campephilus principalis (considered (E) by FOSRC) (Note: Often considered extinct; see the species' article for the controversy surrounding it.)

== Falcons and caracaras ==
Order: Falconiformes Family: Falconidae

The Falconidae is a family of diurnal birds of prey containing the falcons and caracaras. They differ from hawks, eagles, and kites in that they kill with their beaks instead of their talons.

- Crested caracara, Caracara plancus
- Yellow-headed caracara, Milvago chimachima (A)
- Eurasian kestrel, Falco tinnunculus (A)
- American kestrel, Falco sparverius
  - "Cuban American kestrel", F. s. sparveroides (A)
- Merlin, Falco columbarius
- Gyrfalcon, Falco rusticolus (A)
- Peregrine falcon, Falco peregrinus
- Prairie falcon, Falco mexicanus (A)

== New World and African parrots ==
Order: Psittaciformes Family: Psittacidae

Characteristic features of parrots include a strong curved bill, an upright stance, strong legs, and clawed zygodactyl feet. Many parrots are vividly colored, and some are multi-colored. In size they range from 8 cm (3.1 in) to 1 m (3.3 ft) in length. Most of the more than 150 species in this family are found in the New World.

- Monk parakeet, Myiopsitta monachus (I)
- Carolina parakeet, Conuropsis carolinensis (E)
- Green parakeet, Psittacara holochlorus (A)
- Nanday parakeet, Aratinga nenday (I)
- Mitred parakeet, Psittacara mitratus (I)
- White-winged parakeet, Brotogeris versicolurus (I)

== Old World parrots ==
Order: Psittaciformes Family: Psittaculidae

Characteristic features of parrots include a strong curved bill, an upright stance, strong legs, and clawed zygodactyl feet. Many parrots are vividly colored, and some are multi-colored. In size they range from 8 cm (3.1 in) to 1 m (3.3 ft) in length. Old World parrots are found from Africa east across south and southeast Asia and Oceania to Australia and New Zealand.

- Budgerigar, Melopsittacus undulatus (I) (e) ("Disestablished" per the FOSRC)

== Tityras and allies ==
Order: Passeriformes Family: Tityridae

Tityridae is family of suboscine passerine birds found in forest and woodland in the Neotropics. The approximately 30 species in this family were formerly lumped with the families Pipridae and Cotingidae. They are small to medium-sized birds.

- Rose-throated becard, Pachyramphus aglaiae (A)

== Tyrant flycatchers ==
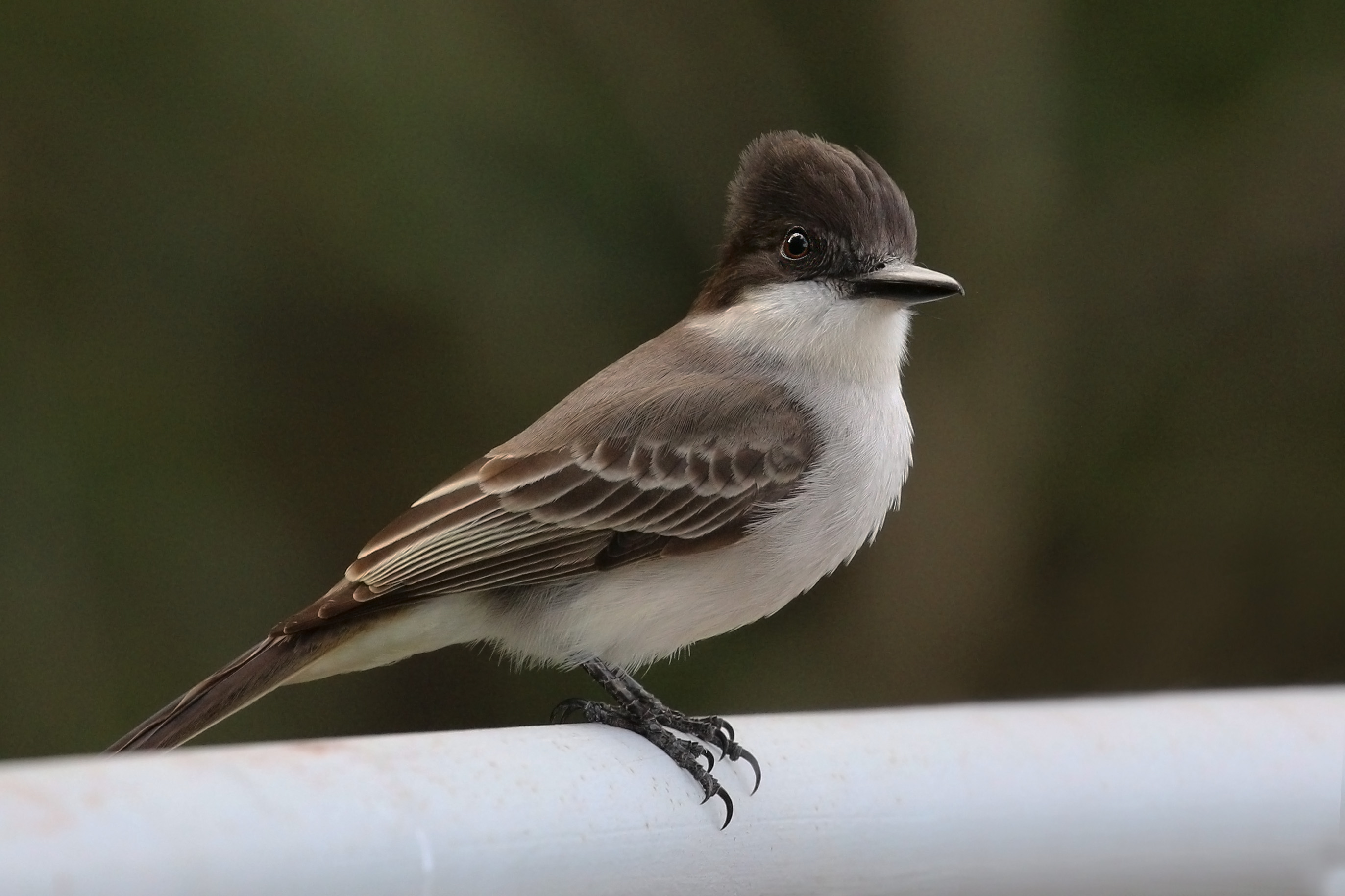
La Sagra's flycatcher

Order: Passeriformes Family: Tyrannidae

Tyrant flycatchers are passerines which occur throughout North and South America. They superficially resemble the Old World flycatchers, but are more robust and have stronger bills. They do not have the sophisticated vocal capabilities of the songbirds. Most, but not all, are rather plain. As the name implies, most are insectivorous.

- Elaenia species, Elaenia sp. (A)
- Ash-throated flycatcher, Myiarchus cinerascens
- Great crested flycatcher, Myiarchus crinitus
- Dusky-capped flycatcher, Myiarchus tuberculifer (A)
- Brown-crested flycatcher, Myiarchus tyrannulus
- Great kiskadee, Pitangus sulphuratus (A)
- Boat-billed flycatcher, Megarynchus pitangua (A)
- La Sagra's flycatcher, Myiarchus sagrae (A)
- Sulphur-bellied flycatcher, Myiodynastes luteiventris (A)
- Piratic flycatcher, Empidonomus leucophaius (A)
- Variegated flycatcher, Empidonomus varius (A)
- Tropical kingbird, Tyrannus melancholicus
- Cassin's kingbird, Tyrannus vociferans (A)
- Western kingbird, Tyrannus verticalis
- Eastern kingbird, Tyrannus tyrannus
- Gray kingbird, Tyrannus dominicensis
- Loggerhead kingbird, Tyrannus caudifasciatus (A)
- Giant kingbird, Tyrannus cubensis (A?)
- Scissor-tailed flycatcher, Tyrannus forficatus
- Fork-tailed flycatcher, Tyrannus savana (A)
- Olive-sided flycatcher, Contopus cooperi
- Western wood-pewee, Contopus sordidulus (A)
- Eastern wood-pewee, Contopus virens
- Cuban pewee, Contopus cariibaeus (A)
- Yellow-bellied flycatcher, Empidonax flaviventris (A)
- Acadian flycatcher, Empidonax virescens
- Alder flycatcher, Empidonax alnorum
- Willow flycatcher, Empidonax traillii (A)
- Least flycatcher, Empidonax minimus
- Hammond's flycatcher, Empidonax hammondii (A)
- Gray flycatcher, Empidonax wrightii (A)
- Western flycatcher, Empidonax difficilis (A)
- Black phoebe, Sayornis nigricans (A)
- Eastern phoebe, Sayornis phoebe
- Say's phoebe, Sayornis saya (A)
- Vermilion flycatcher, Pyrocephalus rubinus

== Antbirds ==
Order: Passeriformes Family: Thamnophilidae

The antbirds are a large family of small passerine birds of subtropical and tropical Central and South America. They are forest birds which tend to feed on insects on or near the ground.

- Glossy antshrike, Sakesphorus luctuosus (A) (not on the AOS Check-list)

== Ovenbirds ==
Order: Passeriformes Family: Furnariidae

Ovenbirds comprise a large family of small sub-oscine passerine bird species found in Central and South America. They are a diverse group of insectivores which gets its name from the elaborate "oven-like" clay nests built by some species, although others build stick nests or nest in tunnels or clefts in rock. The woodcreepers are brownish birds which maintain an upright vertical posture, supported by their stiff tail vanes. They feed mainly on insects taken from tree trunks.

- Hylexetastes species, Hylexetastes sp. (A) (not on the AOS Check-list)

== Vireos, shrike-babblers, and erpornis ==
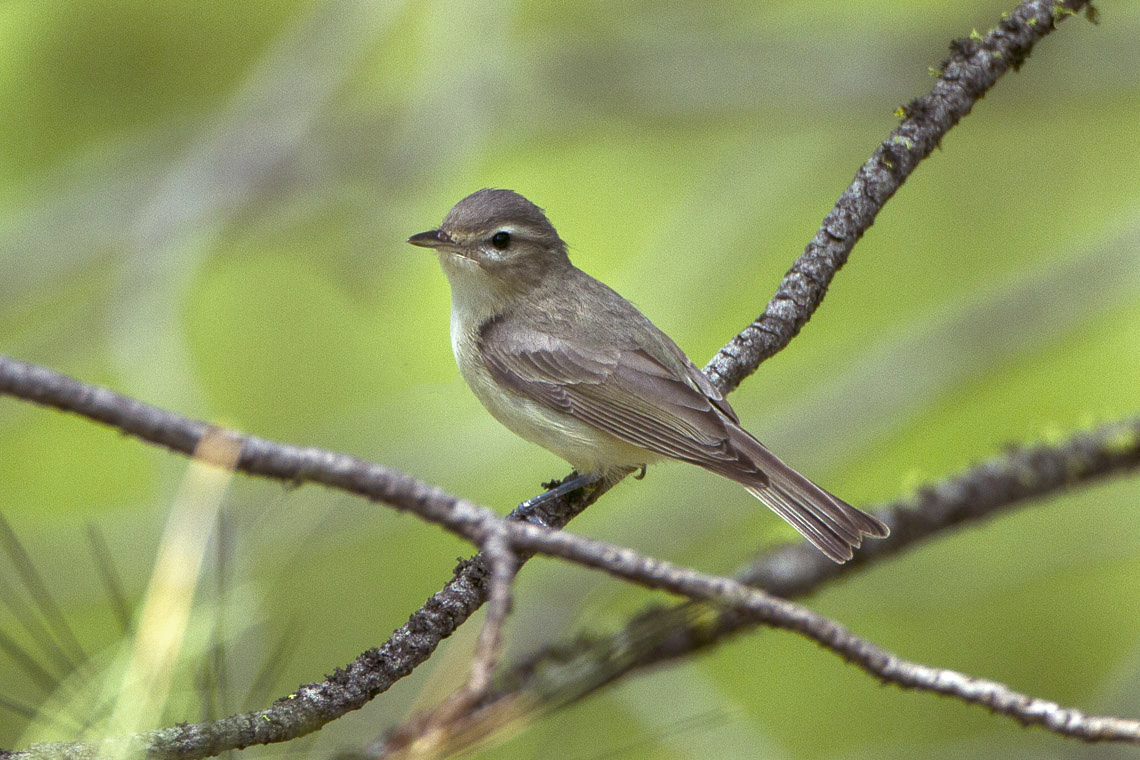
Warbling vireo

Order: Passeriformes Family: Vireonidae

The vireos are a group of small to medium-sized passerines. They are typically greenish in color and resemble wood warblers apart from their heavier bills.

- Black-capped vireo, Vireo atricapilla (A)
- White-eyed vireo, Vireo griseus
- Thick-billed vireo, Vireo crassirostris
- Cuban vireo, Vireo gundlachii (A)
- Bell's vireo, Vireo bellii
- Yellow-throated vireo, Vireo flavifrons
- Blue-headed vireo, Vireo solitarius
- Philadelphia vireo, Vireo philadelphicus
- Warbling vireo, Vireo gilvus
- Red-eyed vireo, Vireo olivaceus
- Yellow-green vireo, Vireo flavoviridis (A)
- Black-whiskered vireo, Vireo altiloquus

== Shrikes ==
Order: Passeriformes Family: Laniidae

Shrikes are passerines known for their habit of catching other birds and small animals and impaling the uneaten portions of their bodies on thorns. A shrike's beak is hooked, like that of a typical bird of prey.

- Loggerhead shrike, Lanius ludovicianus
- Northern shrike, Lanius borealis (A?)

== Crows, jays, and magpies ==
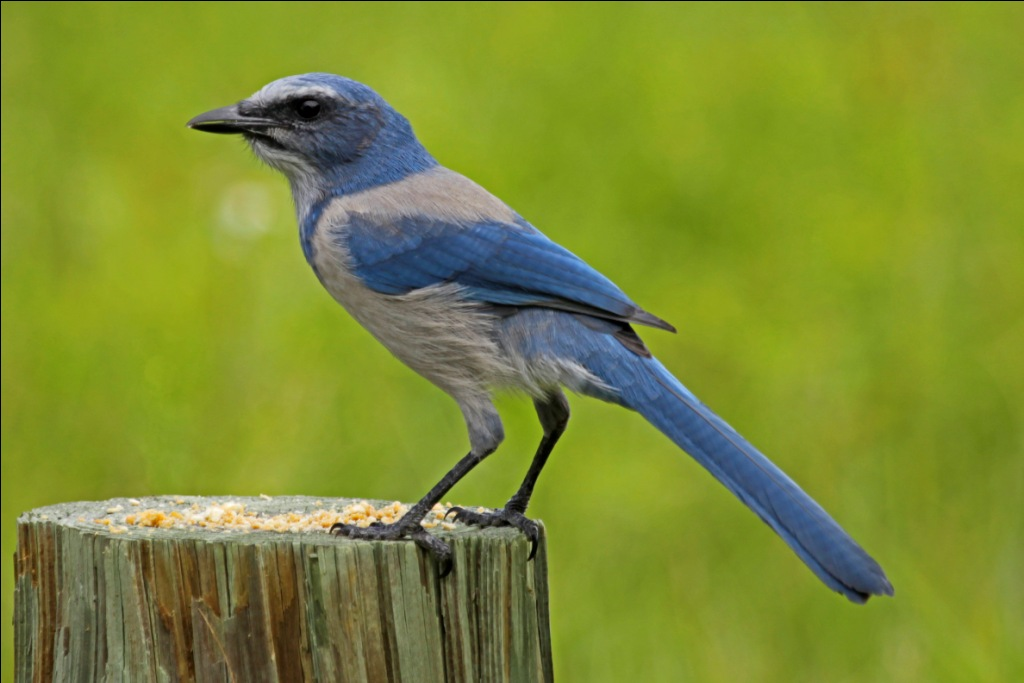
Florida scrub-jay

Order: Passeriformes Family: Corvidae

The family Corvidae includes crows, ravens, jays, choughs, magpies, treepies, nutcrackers, and ground jays. Corvids are above average in size among the Passeriformes and some of the larger species show high levels of intelligence.

- Black-throated magpie-jay, Calocitta colliei (A)
- Blue jay, Cyanocitta cristata
- Florida scrub-jay, Aphelocoma coerulescens
- Woodhouse's scrub-jay, Aphelocoma woodhouseii (A)
- Black-billed magpie, Pica hudsonia (A)
- Eurasian jackdaw, Corvus monedula (A?)
- American crow, Corvus brachyrhynchos
- Carrion crow, Corvus corone (A) (not on the AOS Check-list)
- Tamaulipas crow, Corvus imparatus (A)
- Fish crow, Corvus ossifragus
- Sinaloa crow, Corvus sinaloae (A)
- Common raven, Corvus corax (A)

== Tits, chickadees, and titmice ==
Order: Passeriformes Family: Paridae

The Paridae are mainly small stocky woodland species with short stout bills. Some have crests. They are adaptable birds, with a mixed diet including seeds and insects.

- Carolina chickadee, Poecile carolinensis
- Black-capped chickadee, Poecile atricapillus (A)
- Boreal chickadee, Poecile hudsonicus (A)
- Juniper titmouse, Baeolophus ridgwayi (A)
- Tufted titmouse, Baeolophus bicolor
- Black-crested titmouse, Baeolophus atricristatus (A)

== Larks ==
Order: Passeriformes Family: Alaudidae

Larks are small terrestrial birds with often extravagant songs and display flights. Most larks are fairly dull in appearance. Their food is insects and seeds.

- Horned lark, Eremophila alpestris

== Swallows ==
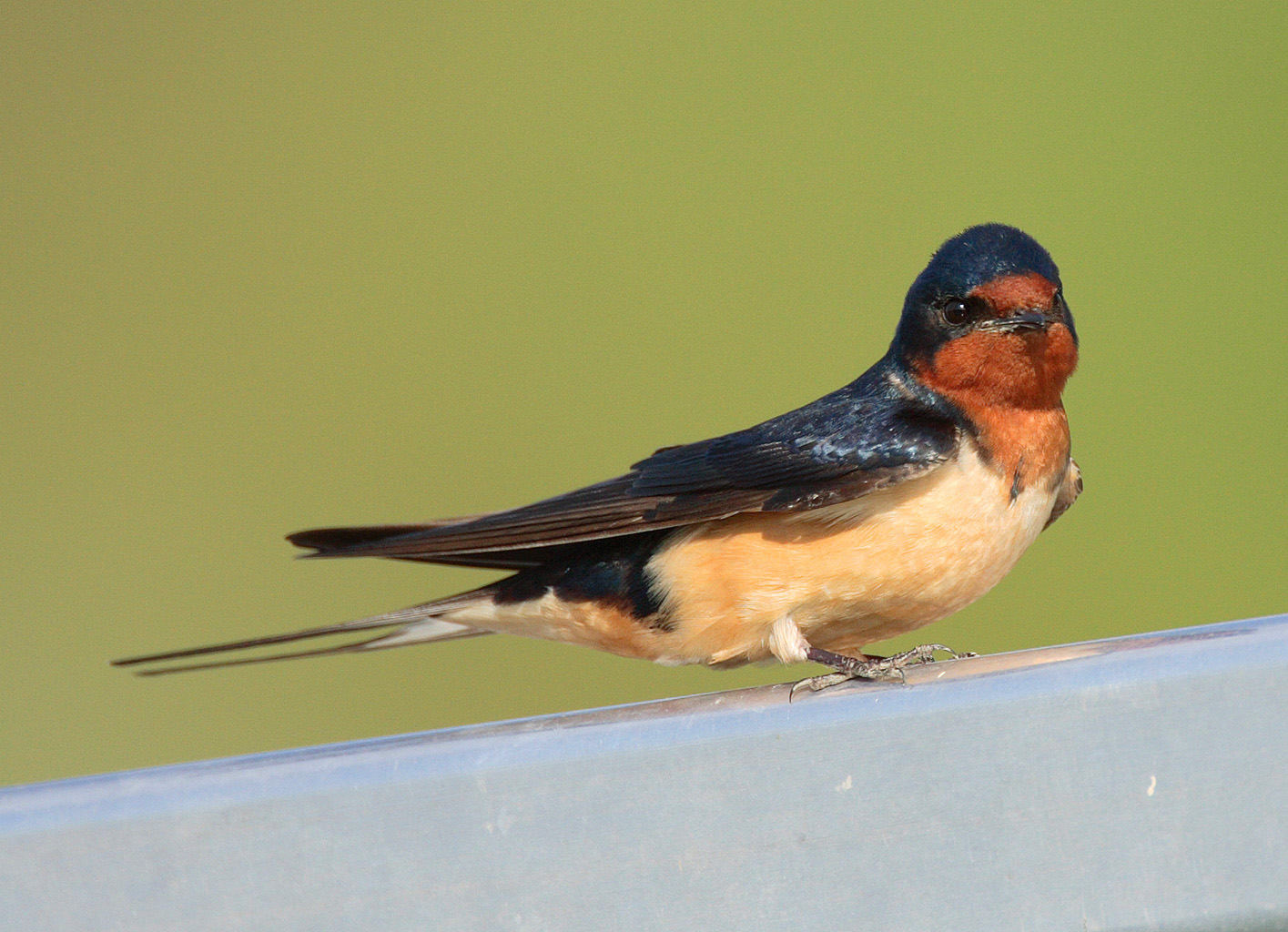
Barn swallow

Order: Passeriformes Family: Hirundinidae

The family Hirundinidae is adapted to aerial feeding. They have a slender streamlined body, long pointed wings, and a short bill with a wide gape. The feet are adapted to perching rather than walking, and the front toes are partly joined at the base.

- Bank swallow, Riparia riparia
- Tree swallow, Tachycineta bicolor
- Bahama swallow, Tachycineta cyaneovirdis (A)
- Violet-green swallow, Tachycineta thalassina (A)
- Mangrove swallow, Tachycineta albilinea (A)
- Northern rough-winged swallow, Stelgidopteryx serripennis
- Southern rough-winged swallow, Stelgidopteryx ruficollis (A)
- Brown-chested martin, Progne tapera (A)
- Purple martin, Progne subis
- Gray-breasted martin, Progne chalybea (A)
- Southern martin, Progne elegans (A)
- Cuban martin, Progne cryptoleuca (A)
- Caribbean martin, Progne dominicensis (A)
- Barn swallow, Hirundo rustica
- Cliff swallow, Petrochelidon pyrrhonota
- Cave swallow, Petrochelidon fulva

== Leaf warblers ==
Order: Passeriformes Family: Phylloscopidae

Leaf warblers are a family of small insectivorous birds found mostly in Eurasia and ranging into Wallacea and Africa. The species are of various sizes, often green-plumaged above and yellow below, or more subdued with grayish-green to grayish-brown colors.

- Wood warbler, Phylloscopus sibilatrix (A)

== Long-tailed tits ==
Order: Passeriformes Family: Aegithalidae

The long-tailed tits are a family of small passerine birds with medium to long tails. They make woven bag nests in trees. Most eat a mixed diet which includes insects.

- Bushtit, Psaltriparus minimus (A)

== Bulbuls ==
Order: Passeriformes Family: Pycnonotidae

The bulbuls are a family of medium-sized songbirds native to Africa and tropical Asia. They are noisy and gregarious and often have beautiful songs.

- Red-whiskered bulbul, Pycnonotus jocosus (I)

== Kinglets ==
Order: Passeriformes Family: Regulidae

The kinglets are a small family of birds which resemble the titmice. They are very small insectivorous birds. The adults have colored crowns, giving rise to their name.

- Ruby-crowned kinglet, Corthylio calendula
- Golden-crowned kinglet, Regulus satrapa

== Waxwings ==
Order: Passeriformes Family: Bombycillidae

The waxwings are a group of birds with soft silky plumage and unique red tips to some of the wing feathers. In the Bohemian and cedar waxwings, these tips look like sealing wax and give the group its name. These are arboreal birds of northern forests. They live on insects in summer and berries in winter.

- Bohemian waxwing, Bombycilla garrulus (A)
- Cedar waxwing, Bombycilla cedrorum

== Silky-flycatchers ==
Order: Passeriformes Family: Ptiliogonatidae

The silky-flycatchers are a small family of passerine birds which occur mainly in Central America. They are related to waxwings and most species have small crests.

- Phainopepla, Phainopepla nitens (A)

== Nuthatches ==
Order: Passeriformes Family: Sittidae

Nuthatches are small woodland birds. They have the unusual ability to climb down trees head first, unlike most other birds which can only go upwards. Nuthatches have big heads, short tails, and powerful bills and feet.

- Red-breasted nuthatch, Sitta canadensis
- White-breasted nuthatch, Sitta carolinensis
- Brown-headed nuthatch, Sitta pusilla

== Treecreepers ==
Order: Passeriformes Family: Certhiidae

Treecreepers are small woodland birds, brown above and white below. They have thin pointed down-curved bills, which they use to extricate insects from bark. They have stiff tail feathers, like woodpeckers, which they use to support themselves on vertical trees.

- Eurasian treecreeper, Certhia familiaris (A) (not on the AOS Check-list)
- Brown creeper, Certhia americana

== Gnatcatchers ==
Order: Passeriformes Family: Polioptilidae

The family Polioptilidae is a group of small insectivorous passerine birds containing the gnatcatchers and gnatwrens.

- Blue-gray gnatcatcher, Polioptila caerulea
- Black-capped gnatcatcher, Polioptila nigriceps (A)

== Wrens ==
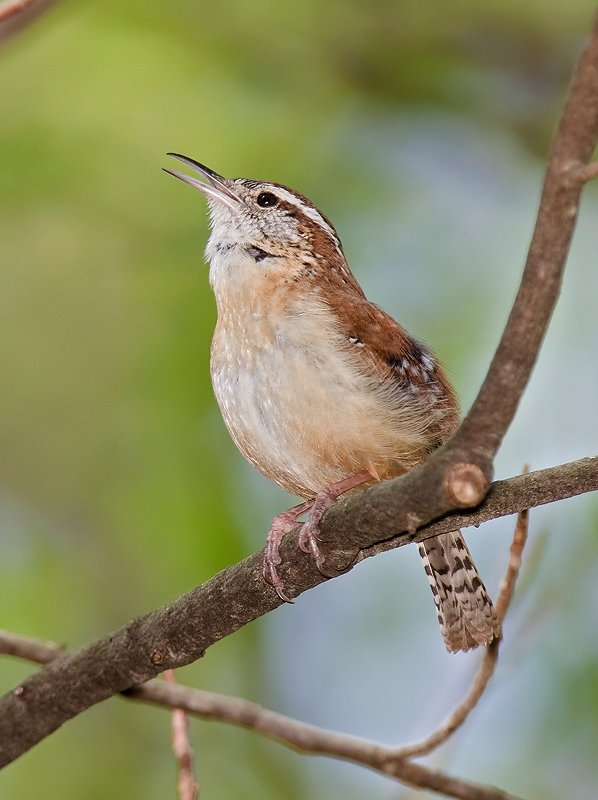
Carolina wren

Order: Passeriformes Family: Troglodytidae

Wrens are small and inconspicuous birds, except for their loud songs. They have short wings and thin down-turned bills. Several species often hold their tails upright. All are insectivorous.

- Rock wren, Salpinctes obsoletus (A)
- House wren, Troglodytes aedon
- Winter wren, Troglodytes hyemalis
- Sedge wren, Cistothorus platensis
- Marsh wren, Cistothorus palustris
- Carolina wren, Thryothorus ludovicianus
- Bewick's wren, Thryomanes bewickii (A)

== Mockingbirds and thrashers ==
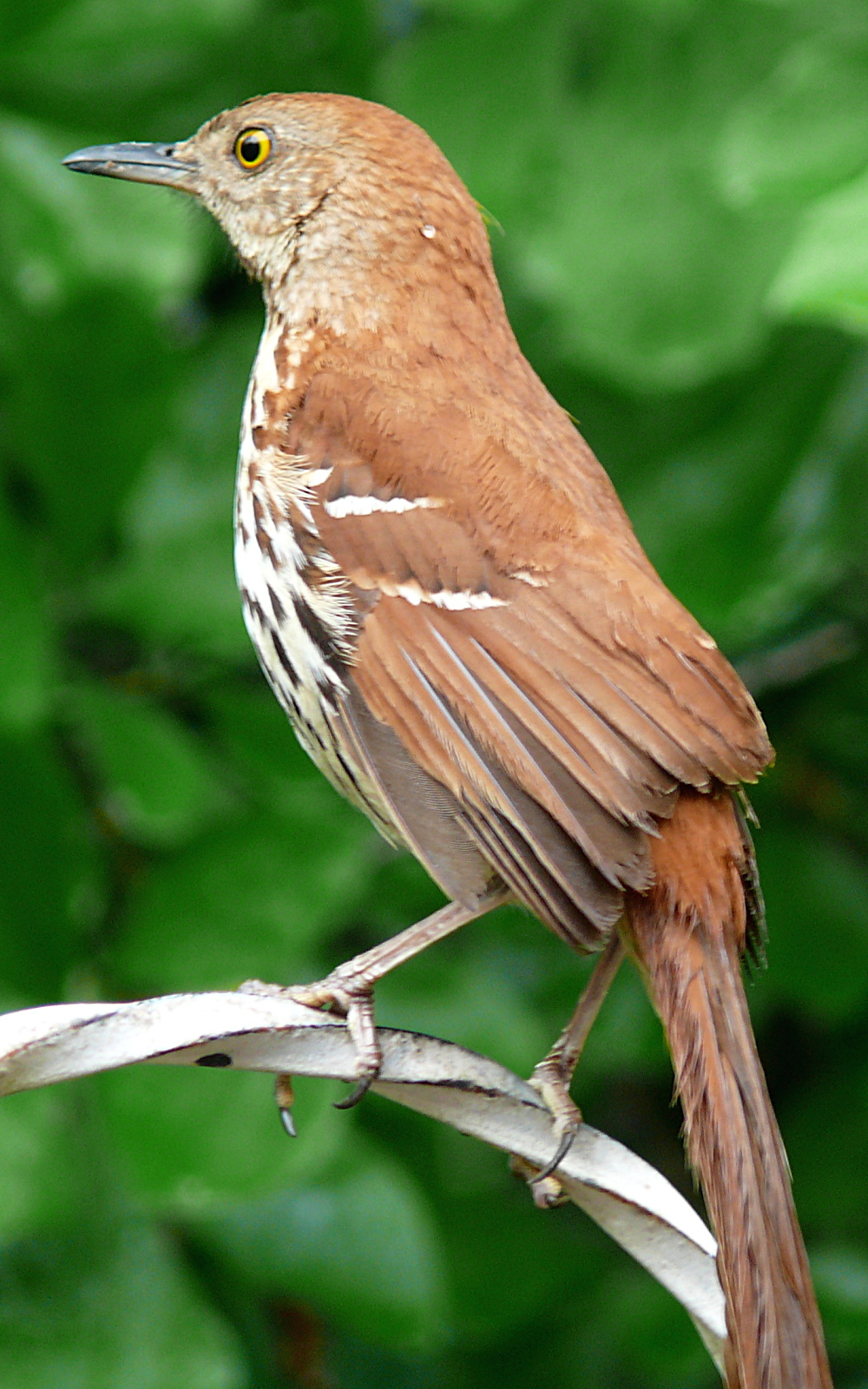
Brown thrasher

Order: Passeriformes Family: Mimidae

The mimids are a family of passerine birds which includes thrashers, mockingbirds, tremblers, and the New World catbirds. They are notable for their vocalization, especially their remarkable ability to mimic a wide variety of birds and other sounds heard outdoors. The species tend towards dull grays and browns in their appearance.

- Gray catbird, Dumetella carolinensis
- Pearly-eyed thrasher, Margarops fuscatus (A)
- Curve-billed thrasher, Toxostoma curvirostre (A)
- Brown thrasher, Toxostoma rufum
- Long-billed thrasher, Toxostoma longirostre (A)
- California thrasher, Toxostoma redivivum (A)
- Sage thrasher, Oreoscoptes montanus (A)
- Bahama mockingbird, Mimus gundlachii (A)
- Tropical mockingbird, Mimus gilvus (A)
- Northern mockingbird, Mimus polyglottos

== Starlings ==
Order: Passeriformes Family: Sturnidae

Starlings are small to medium-sized passerines with strong feet. Their flight is strong and direct and they are very gregarious. Their preferred habitat is open country, and they eat insects and fruit. Their plumage is typically dark with a metallic sheen.

- European starling, Sturnus vulgaris (I)
- Common myna, Acridotheres tristis (I)

== Thrushes and allies ==
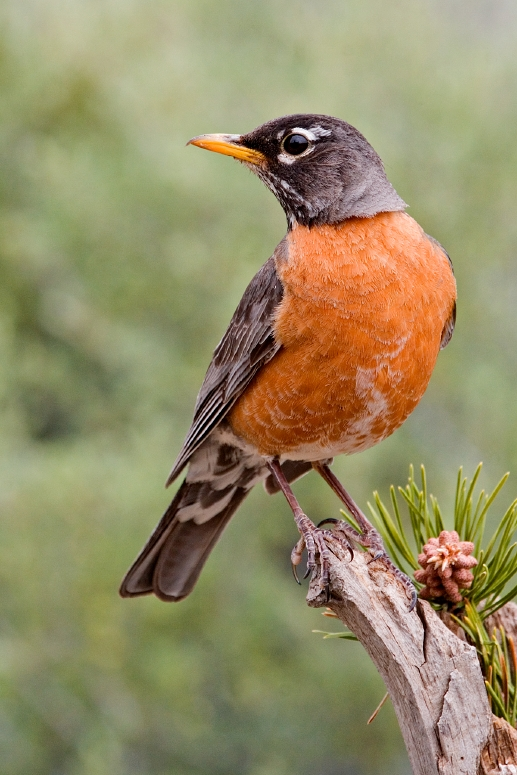
American robin

Order: Passeriformes Family: Turdidae

The thrushes are a group of passerine birds that occur mainly but not exclusively in the Old World. They are plump, soft plumaged, small to medium-sized insectivores or sometimes omnivores, often feeding on the ground. Many have attractive songs.

- Eastern bluebird, Sialia sialis
- Western bluebird, Sialia mexicana (A)
- Mountain bluebird, Sialia currucoides (A)
- Townsend's solitaire, Myadestes townsendi (A)
- Veery, Catharus fuscescens
- Gray-cheeked thrush, Catharus minimus
- Bicknell's thrush, Catharus bicknelli (A)
- Swainson's thrush, Catharus ustulatus
- Hermit thrush, Catharus guttatus
- Wood thrush, Hylocichla mustelina
- Redwing, Turdus iliacus (A)
- American robin, Turdus migratorius
- Western red-legged thrush, Turdus plumbeus (A)
- Varied thrush, Ixoreus naevius (A)

== Old World flycatchers ==
Order: Passeriformes Family: Muscicapidae

The Old World flycatchers are a large family of small passerine birds. These are mainly small arboreal insectivores, many of which, as the name implies, take their prey on the wing.

- European robin, Erithacus rubecula (A)
- Northern wheatear, Oenanthe oenanthe (A)

== Waxbills and allies ==
Order: Passeriformes Family: Estrildidae

The estrildid finches are small passerine birds native to the Old World tropics. They are gregarious and often colonial seed eaters with short thick but pointed bills. They are all similar in structure and habits, but have wide variation in plumage colors and patterns.

- Scaly-breasted munia, Lonchura punctulata (I)
- Tricolored munia, Lonchura malacca (I)

== Old World sparrows ==
Order: Passeriformes Family: Passeridae

Old World sparrows are small passerine birds. In general, sparrows tend to be small plump brownish or grayish birds with short tails and short powerful beaks. Sparrows are seed eaters, but they also consume small insects.

- House sparrow, Passer domesticus (I)

== Wagtails and pipits ==
Order: Passeriformes Family: Motacillidae

Motacillidae is a family of small passerine birds with medium to long tails. They include the wagtails, longclaws, and pipits. They are slender, ground-feeding insectivores of open country.

- Eastern yellow wagtail, Motacilla tschutschensis (A)
- White wagtail, Motacilla alba (A)
- American pipit, Anthus rubescens
- Sprague's pipit, Anthus spragueii (A)

== Finches, euphonias, and allies ==
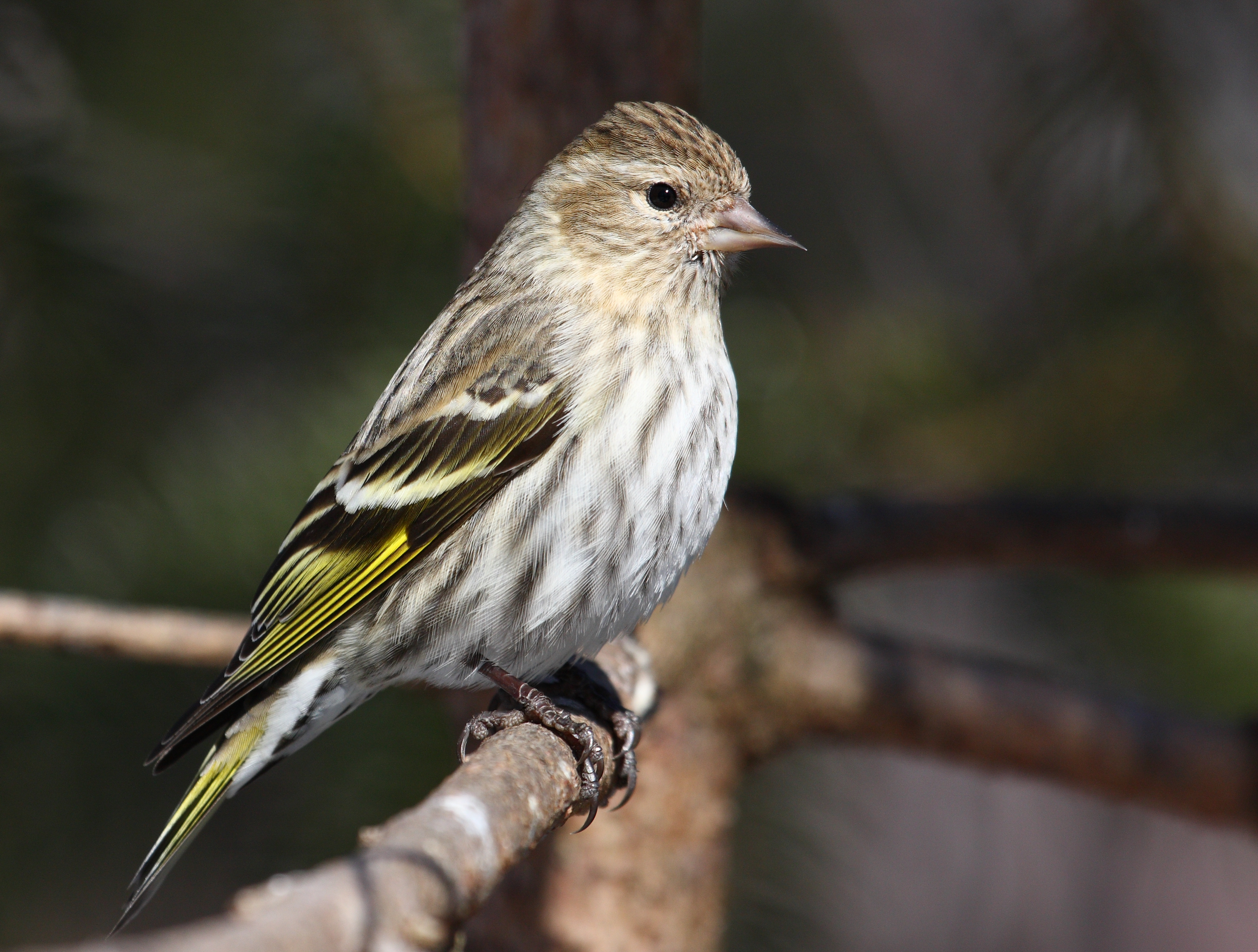
Pine siskin

Order: Passeriformes Family: Fringillidae

Finches are seed-eating passerines. They are small to moderately large and have strong, usually conical and sometimes very large, beaks. All have twelve tail feathers and nine primaries. They have a bouncing flight with alternating bouts of flapping and gliding on closed wings, and most sing well.

- Evening grosbeak, Coccothraustes vespertinus (A)
- House finch, Haemorhous mexicanus (I) (native to the southwestern U.S; introduced in the east)
- Purple finch, Haemorhous purpureus
- European greenfinch, Chloris chloris (A) (not on the AOS Check-list)
- Common redpoll, Acanthis flammea (A)
- Red crossbill, Loxia curvirostra (A)
- White-winged crossbill, Loxia leucoptera (A)
- European goldfinch, Carduelis carduelis (A)
- Eurasian siskin, Spinus spinus (A)
- Pine siskin, Spinus pinus
- Lesser goldfinch, Spinus psaltria (A)
- American goldfinch, Spinus tristis

== Longspurs and snow buntings ==
Order: Passeriformes Family: Calcariidae

The Calcariidae are a group of passerine birds that had traditionally been grouped with the New World sparrows, but differ in a number of respects and are usually found in open grassy areas.

- Lapland longspur, Calcarius lapponicus (A)
- Chestnut-collared longspur, Calcarius ornatus (A)
- Smith's longspur, Calcarius pictus (A)
- Snow bunting, Plectrophenax nivalis (A)

== Old World buntings ==
Order: Passeriformes Family: Emberizidae

Emberizidae is a family of passerine birds containing a single genus. Until 2017, the New World sparrows (Passerellidae) were also considered part of this family.

- Little bunting, Emberiza pusilla (A)

== New World sparrows ==
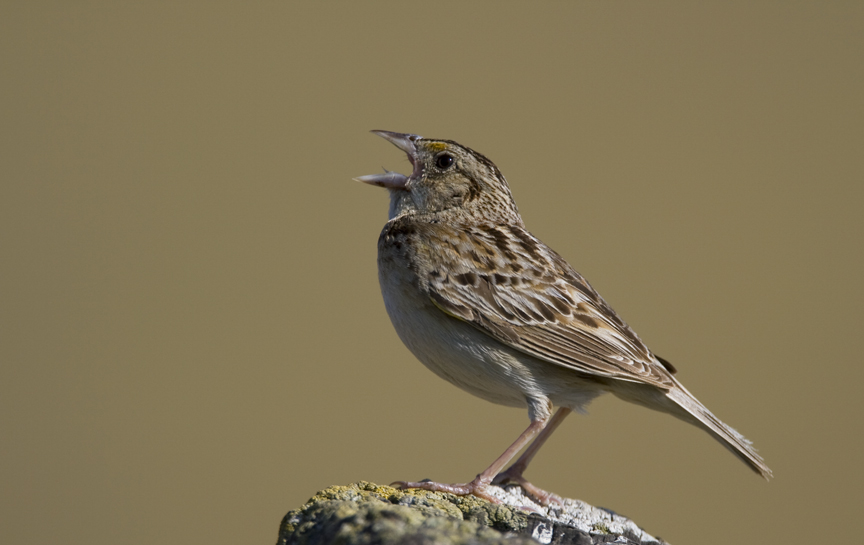
Grasshopper sparrow

Order: Passeriformes Family: Passerellidae

Until 2017, these species were considered part of the family Emberizidae. Most of the species are known as sparrows, but these birds are not closely related to the Old World sparrows which are in the family Passeridae. Many of these have distinctive head patterns.

- Rufous-winged sparrow, Peucaea carpalis (hypothetical)
- Bachman's sparrow, Peucaea aestivalis
- Grasshopper sparrow, Ammodramus savannarum
  - Florida grasshopper sparrow, A. s. floridanus
- Rufous-collared sparrow, Zonotrichia capensis (A)
- Black-throated sparrow, Amphispiza bilineata (A)
- Lark sparrow, Chondestes grammacus
- Lark bunting, Calamospiza melanocorys (A)
- Chipping sparrow, Spizella passerina
- Clay-colored sparrow, Spizella pallida
- Field sparrow, Spizella pusilla
- Brewer's sparrow, Spizella breweri (A)
- Fox sparrow, Passerella iliaca
- American tree sparrow, Spizelloides arborea (A)
- Dark-eyed junco, Junco hyemalis
  - "Oregon junco", J. h. oreganus group (A)
- White-crowned sparrow, Zonotrichia leucophrys
- Golden-crowned sparrow, Zonotrichia atricapilla (A)
- Harris's sparrow, Zonotrichia querula (A)
- White-throated sparrow, Zonotrichia albicollis
- Vesper sparrow, Pooecetes gramineus
- LeConte's sparrow, Ammospiza leconteii
- Seaside sparrow, Ammospiza maritima
  - Dusky seaside sparrow, A. m. nigrescens (E)
- Nelson's sparrow, Ammospiza nelsoni
- Saltmarsh sparrow, Ammospiza caudacta
- Henslow's sparrow, Centronyx henslowii
- Savannah sparrow, Passerculus sandwichensis
- Song sparrow, Melospiza melodia
- Lincoln's sparrow, Melospiza lincolnii
- Swamp sparrow, Melospiza georgiana
- Abert's towhee, Melozone aberti (A)
- Green-tailed towhee, Pipilo chlorurus (A)
- Spotted towhee, Pipilo maculatus (A)
- Eastern towhee, Pipilo erythrophthalmus

== Spindalises ==
Order: Passeriformes Family: Spindalidae

The members of this small family, newly recognized in 2017, are native to the Greater Antilles. One species occurs fairly frequently in Florida.

- Western spindalis, Spindalis zena

== Yellow-breasted chat ==
Order: Passeriformes Family: Icteriidae

This species was historically placed in the wood-warblers (Parulidae) but nonetheless most authorities were unsure if it belonged there. It was placed in its own family in 2017.

- Yellow-breasted chat, Icteria virens

== Troupials and allies ==
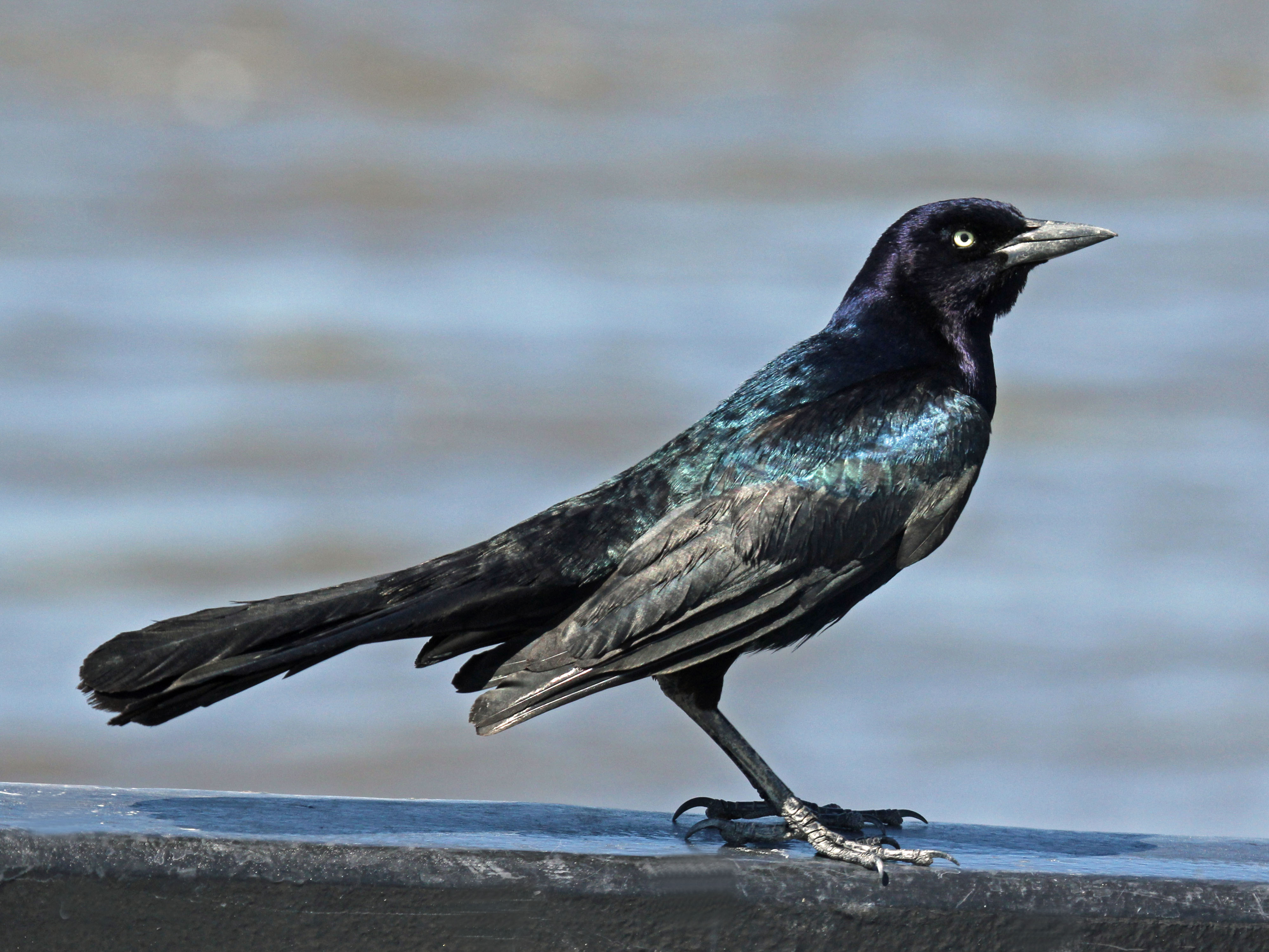
Boat-tailed grackle

Order: Passeriformes Family: Icteridae

The icterids are a group of small to medium-sized, often colorful, passerines restricted to the New World, including the grackles, New World blackbirds and New World orioles. Most have black as a predominant plumage color, often enlivened by yellow, orange or red.

- Yellow-headed blackbird, Xanthocephalus xanthocephalus
- Bobolink, Dolichonyx oryzivorus
- Eastern meadowlark, Sturnella magna
- Western meadowlark, Sturnella neglecta (A)
- Orchard oriole, Icterus spurius
- Hooded oriole, Icterus cucullatus (A)
- Bullock's oriole, Icterus bullockii
- Spot-breasted oriole, Icterus pectoralis (I)
- Baltimore oriole, Icterus galbula
- Scott's oriole, Icterus parisorum (A)
- Red-winged blackbird, Agelaius phoeniceus
- Tricolored blackbird, Agelaius tricolor (A)
- Tawny-shouldered blackbird, Agelaius umeralis (A)
- Shiny cowbird, Molothrus bonariensis
- Bronzed cowbird, Molothrus aeneus
- Brown-headed cowbird, Molothrus ater
- Rusty blackbird, Euphagus carolinus
- Brewer's blackbird, Euphagus cyanocephalus
- Common grackle, Quiscalus quiscula
- Boat-tailed grackle, Quiscalus major
- Great-tailed grackle, Quiscalus mexicanus (A)

== New World warblers ==
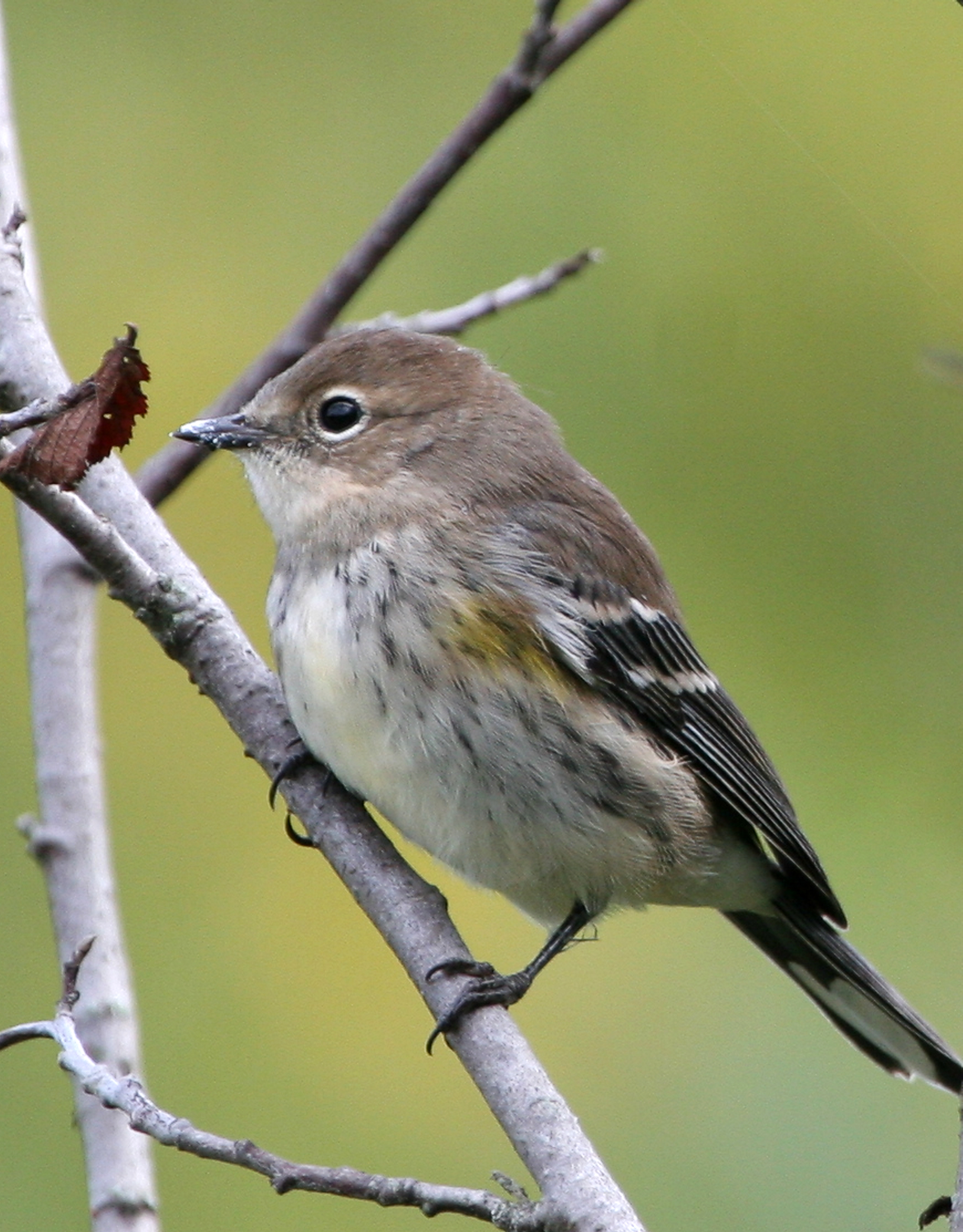
Yellow-rumped warbler

Order: Passeriformes Family: Parulidae

The wood warblers are a group of small, often colorful, passerines restricted to the New World. Most are arboreal, but some are terrestrial. Most members of this family are insectivores.

- Ovenbird, Seiurus aurocapilla
- Worm-eating warbler, Helmitheros vermivorum
- Louisiana waterthrush, Parkesia motacilla
- Northern waterthrush, Parkesia noveboracensis
- Bachman's warbler, Vermivora bachmanii (E)
- Golden-winged warbler, Vermivora chrysoptera
- Blue-winged warbler, Vermivora cyanoptera
- Black-and-white warbler, Mniotilta varia
- Prothonotary warbler, Protonotaria citrea
- Swainson's warbler, Limnothlypis swainsonii
- Tennessee warbler, Leiothlypis peregrina
- Orange-crowned warbler, Leiothlypis celata
- Nashville warbler, Leiothlypis ruficapilla
- Connecticut warbler, Oporornis agilis
- MacGillivray's warbler, Geothlypis tolmiei (A)
- Mourning warbler, Geothlypis philadelphia (A)
- Kentucky warbler, Geothlypis formosa
- Common yellowthroat, Geothlypis trichas
- Hooded warbler, Setophaga citrina
- American redstart, Setophaga ruticilla
- Kirtland's warbler, Setophaga kirtlandii (A)
- Cape May warbler, Setophaga tigrina
- Cerulean warbler, Setophaga cerulea
- Northern parula, Setophaga americana
- Tropical parula, Setophaga pitiayumi (A?)
- Magnolia warbler, Setophaga magnolia
- Bay-breasted warbler, Setophaga castanea
- Blackburnian warbler, Setophaga fusca
- Yellow warbler, Setophaga petechia
- Chestnut-sided warbler, Setophaga pensylvanica
- Blackpoll warbler, Setophaga striata
- Black-throated blue warbler, Setophaga caerulescens
- Palm warbler, Setophaga palmarum
- Pine warbler, Setophaga pinus
- Yellow-rumped warbler, Setophaga coronata
  - "Audubon's warbler", S. c. auduboni (A)
- Yellow-throated warbler, Setophaga dominica
- Prairie warbler, Setophaga discolor
- Black-throated gray warbler, Setophaga nigrescens (A)
- Townsend's warbler, Setophaga townsendi (A)
- Hermit warbler, Setophaga occidentalis (A)
- Golden-cheeked warbler, Setophaga chrysoparia (A)
- Black-throated green warbler, Setophaga virens
- Canada warbler, Cardellina canadensis
- Wilson's warbler, Cardellina pusilla
- Red-faced warbler, Cardellina rubrifrons (A)
- Painted redstart, Myioborus pictus (hypothetical)

== Cardinals and allies ==
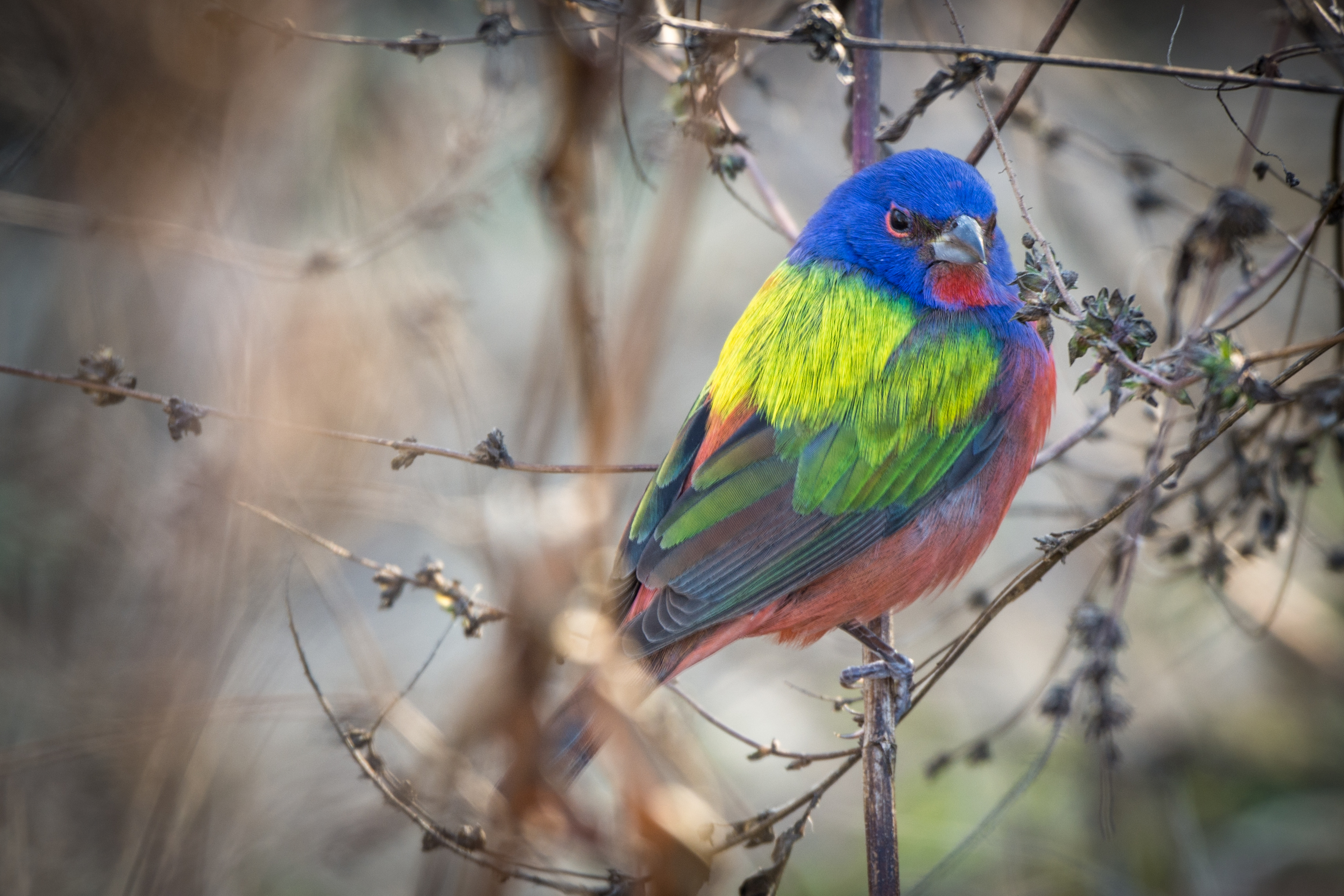
Painted bunting

Order: Passeriformes Family: Cardinalidae

The cardinals are a family of robust, seed-eating birds with strong bills. They are typically associated with open woodland. The sexes usually have distinct plumages.

- Summer tanager, Piranga rubra
- Scarlet tanager, Piranga olivacea
- Western tanager, Piranga ludoviciana
- Northern cardinal, Cardinalis cardinalis
- Pyrrhuloxia, Cardinalis sinuatus (A)
- Yellow grosbeak, Pheuticus chrysopeplus (A)
- Rose-breasted grosbeak, Pheucticus ludovicianus
- Black-headed grosbeak, Pheucticus melanocephalus (A)
- Blue grosbeak, Passerina caerulea
- Lazuli bunting, Passerina amoena (A)
- Indigo bunting, Passerina cyanea
- Varied bunting, Passerina versicolor (A)
- Painted bunting, Passerina ciris
- Dickcissel, Spiza americana

== Tanagers and allies ==
Order: Passeriformes Family: Thraupidae

The tanagers are a large group of small to medium-sized passerine birds restricted to the New World, mainly in the tropics. Many species are brightly colored. As a family they are omnivorous, but individual species specialize in eating fruits, seeds, insects, or other types of food. Most have short, rounded wings.

- Blue-black grassquit, Volatinia jacarina (A)
- Red-legged honeycreeper, Cyanerpes cyaneus (A)
- Bananaquit, Coereba flaveola (A)
- Yellow-faced grassquit, Tiaris olivacea (A)
- Black-faced grassquit, Tiaris bicolor (A)
- Cuban grassquit, Phonipara canora (A)
- Cuban bullfinch, Melopyrrha nigra (A)
- Greater Antillean bullfinch, Melopyrrha violacea (e)

== Notable exotics ==
The following introduced species, while not considered officially established by the FOSRC, have self-sustaining populations and, within range and proper habitat, are likely to be encountered.

- Mandarin duck, Aix galericulata (I)
- Red junglefowl, Gallus gallus (I – Key West)
- Common peafowl, Pavo cristatus (I)
- Ring-necked pheasant, Phasianus colchicus (I)
- Blue-and-yellow macaw, Ara araruana (I)

== See also ==
- List of North American birds
- List of birds of Biscayne National Park
- List of birds of Everglades National Park
- List of birds of Dry Tortugas National Park
- List of mammals of Florida
- List of invasive species in Florida
- List of invasive species in the Everglades
- List of amphibians of Florida
- List of reptiles of Florida
- Snakes of Florida
- Fauna of Florida
