= 1932 Atlantic hurricane season =

- Season summary map

Seasonal boundaries
- First system formed: May 5, 1932
- Last system dissipated: November 13, 1932

Strongest storm
- Name: "Cuba"
  - Maximum winds: 175 mph (280 km/h) (1-minute sustained)
  - Lowest pressure: 915 mbar (hPa; 27.02 inHg)

Seasonal statistics
- Total storms: 15
- Hurricanes: 6
- Major hurricanes (Cat. 3+): 4
- Total fatalities: ≥3,472 direct, 1 indirect
- Total damage: $87.57 million (1932 USD)

Related articles
- 1932 Pacific hurricane season; 1920-1937 Pacific typhoon seasons; 1930s North Indian Ocean cyclone seasons

The 1932 Atlantic hurricane season featured several powerful storms, including the Cuba hurricane, which remains the deadliest tropical cyclone in the history of Cuba and among the most intense to strike the island nation. It was a relatively active season, with fifteen known storms, six hurricanes, and four major hurricanes. (Note: A major hurricane is a storm that ranks as Category 3 or higher on the Saffir–Simpson hurricane scale.) However, tropical cyclones that did not approach populated areas or shipping lanes, especially if they were relatively weak and of short duration, may have remained undetected. Because technologies such as satellite monitoring were not available until the 1960s, historical data on tropical cyclones from this period are often not reliable. The Atlantic hurricane reanalysis project discovered four new tropical cyclones, all of which were tropical storms, that occurred during the year. Two storms attained Category 5 intensity, the first known occurrence in which multiple Category 5 hurricanes formed in the same year. The season's first cyclone developed on May 5, while the last remaining system transitioned into an extratropical cyclone by November 13.

The strongest storm of the season was the Cuba hurricane, which heavily impacted portions of northern Colombia, the Netherlands Antilles, the Greater Antilles, and the Bahamas in November, leaving at least 3,144 fatalities and $44 million (1932 USD) in damage, (Note: All damage totals are in 1932 United States dollars unless otherwise noted.) the vast majority of which occurred in Cuba. In early September, the Abaco hurricane battered the northern Bahamas as a Category 5 hurricane, devastating portions of the island nation and resulting in at least 16 deaths. Another destructive storm was the Freeport hurricane, which caused 40 deaths and about $7.5 million in damage in Texas in August. The San Ciprian hurricane also wreaked havoc on the Virgin Islands, Puerto Rico, and the Dominican Republic in late September, with damage totaling approximately $35.8 million and the death toll reaching 272. Collectively, the tropical cyclones during the 1932 season caused around $87.57 million in damage and at least 3,473 fatalities.

== Season summary ==
Tropical cyclogenesis began in early May, with a system developing over the central Caribbean Sea on May 5. The storm made landfall in the Dominican Republic, before becoming extratropical offshore the East Coast of the United States on May 10. However, the season went dormant for about three months until the next system, the Freeport hurricane, formed over the southern Gulf of Mexico on August 12. Two other storms originated in the month of August – the Florida–Alabama and Abaco hurricanes. September was the most active month, with a total of six tropical cyclones developing, five tropical storms and one hurricane, the San Ciprián hurricane. Four more tropical cyclones formed in October, including three tropical storms and a hurricane, the Cuba hurricane, though much of its duration was in November. The season's final tropical cyclone, a hurricane, developed well east of the Windward Islands on November 3 and transitioned into an extratropical cyclone southwest of the Azores on November 10.

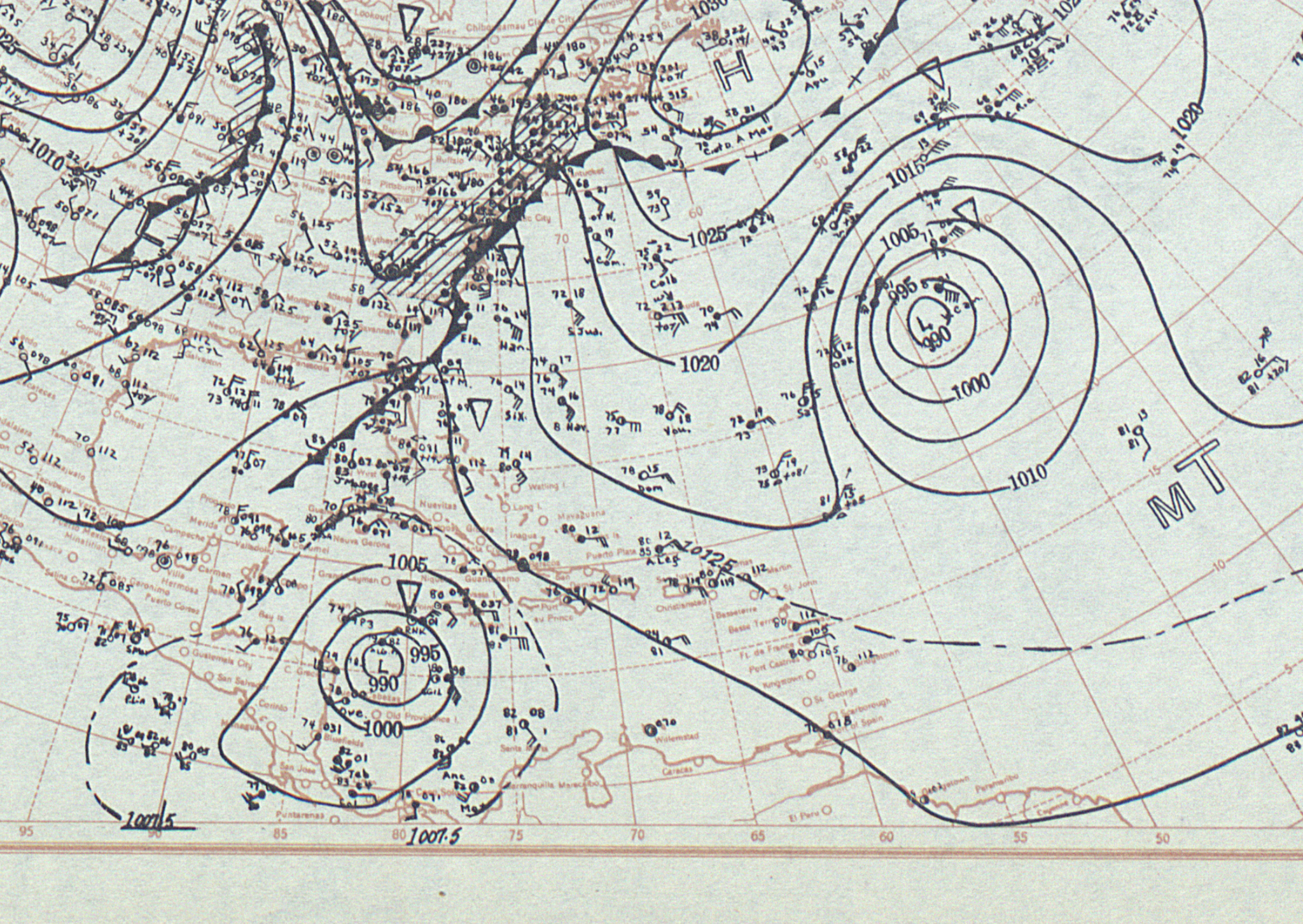
Synoptic weather map showing two active hurricanes in the Atlantic Ocean on November 7, 1932. With the Cuba hurricane (bottom left) in the western Caribbean Sea.

A total of fifteen tropical cyclones developed, the most since 1916. Six of the systems strengthened into a hurricane, while four reached major hurricane status, which is Category 3 or higher on the Saffir–Simpson scale. For the first time on record, two cyclones intensified into Category 5 hurricanes. The Abaco hurricane became the first of four tropical cyclones to have struck the Bahamas at Category 5 intensity, later followed by the Cuba–Brownsville hurricane in 1933, Hurricane Andrew in 1992, and Hurricane Dorian in 2019. Additionally, the Cuba hurricane remains among the most intense tropical systems to strike that country. Most of the storms also impacted land, with several causing devastating effects. Overall, the tropical cyclones of the season collectively resulted in at least $87.57 million in damage and approximately 3,473 deaths.

The season's total activity was reflected with an accumulated cyclone energy (ACE) rating of 170, the highest value since 1926, and well above the 1931–1943 average of 91.2. ACE is a metric used to express the energy used by a tropical cyclone during its lifetime. Therefore, a storm with a longer duration will have high values of ACE. It is only calculated at six-hour increments in which specific tropical and subtropical systems are either at or above sustained wind speeds of 39 mph (63 km/h), which is the threshold for tropical storm intensity. Thus, tropical depressions are not included here.

== Systems ==
=== Tropical Storm One ===
- Tropical storm (SSHWS)
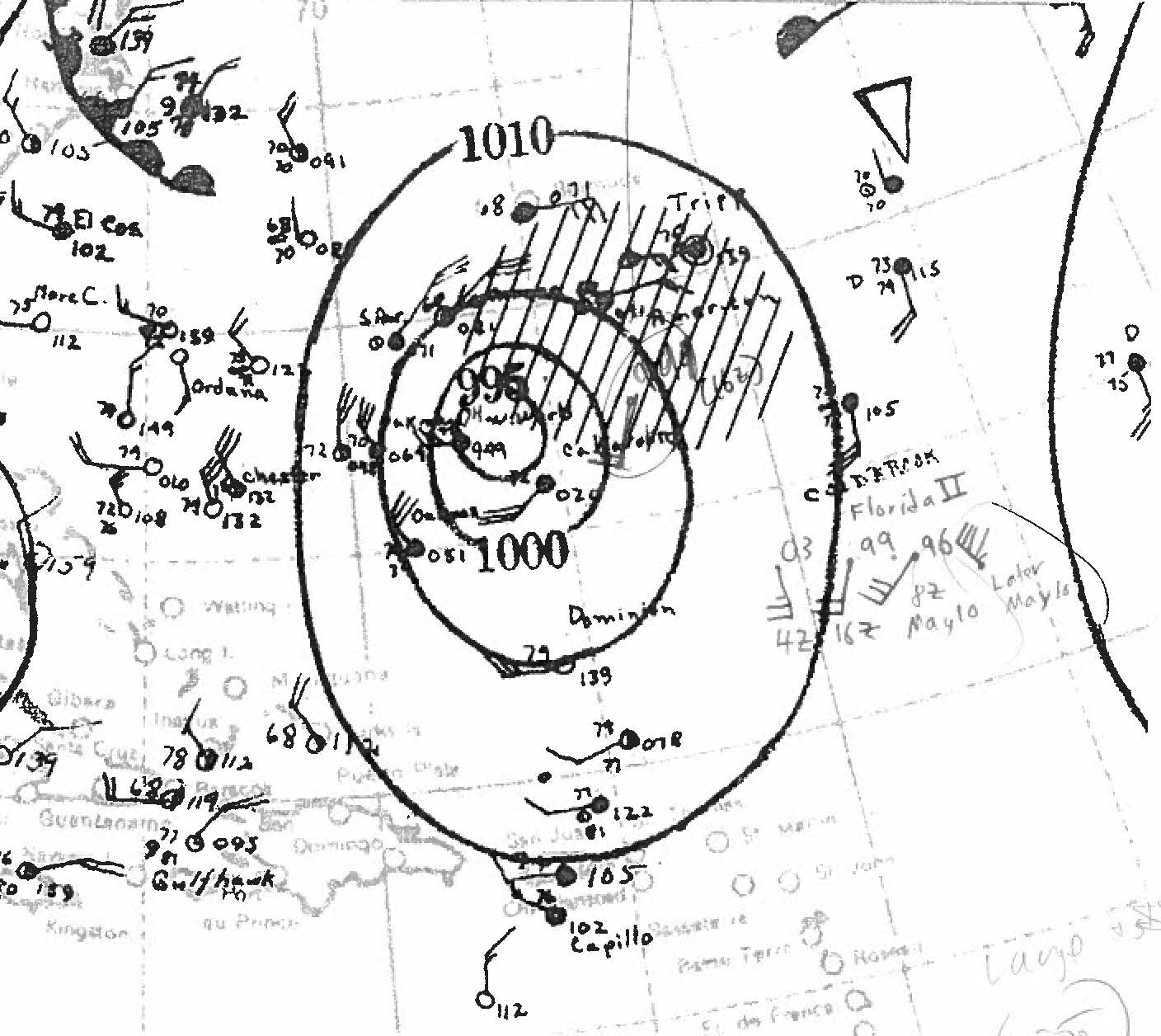
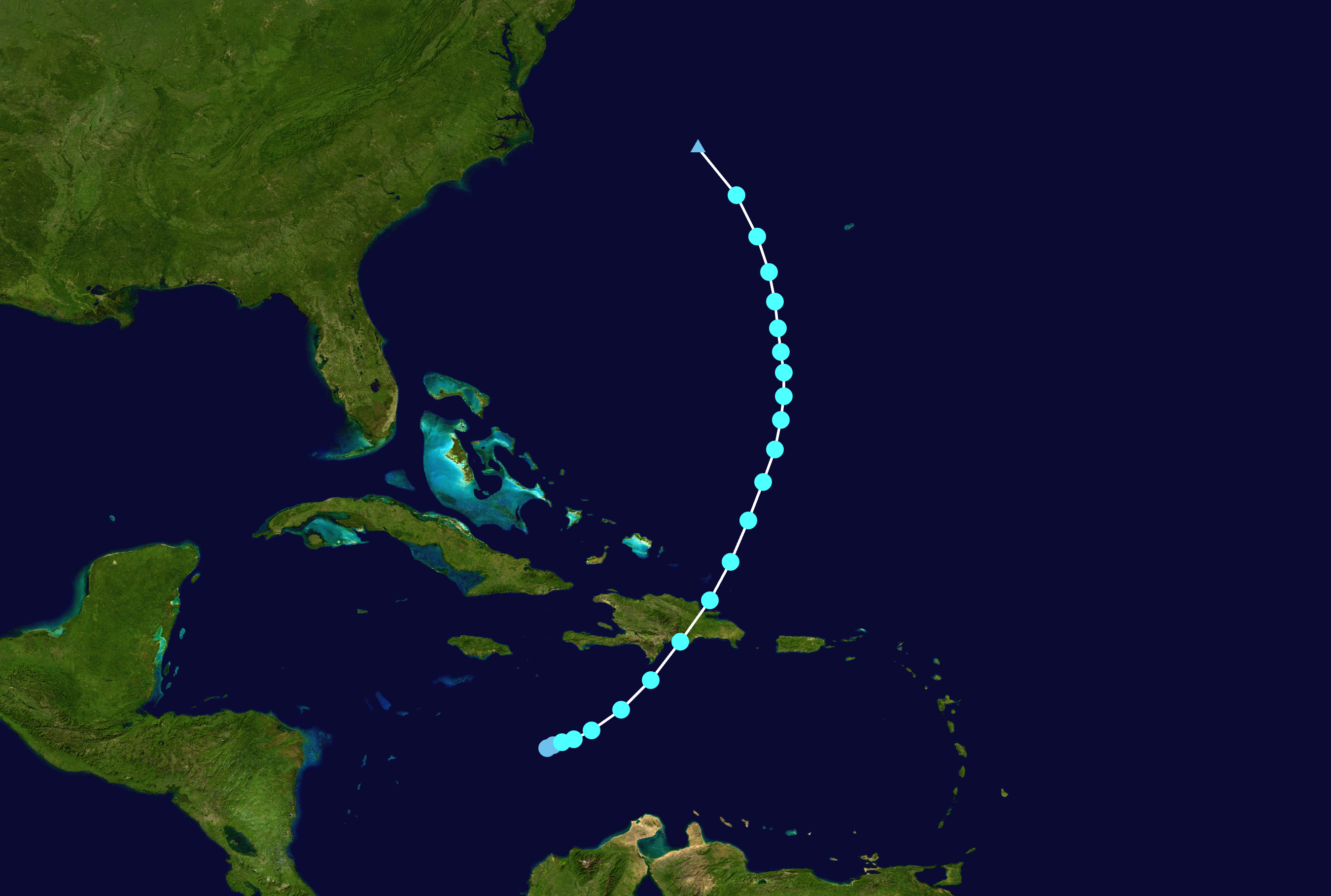
- Duration: May 5 – May 10
- Peak intensity: 65 mph (100 km/h) (1-min); 995 mbar (hPa)

A tropical depression formed on May 5 in the south-central Caribbean Sea. Moving slowly northeast, the system became a tropical storm the next day and gradually strengthened before making landfall just west of Baní in the Dominican Republic's modern-day Peravia Province with winds of 45 mph (72 km/h) on May 7. Within six hours, the storm emerged into the western Atlantic on May 8 and continued to strengthen. The system reached its peak intensity of 65 mph (105 km/h) on May 9 while centered south-southwest of Bermuda. The diffuse system later transitioned into an extratropical cyclone the same day, later dissipating on May 11 well to the northwest of Bermuda after merging with a frontal boundary. Heavy rainfall was reported in far eastern Cuba and the Dominican Republic, with the latter recording over 6 in (150 mm) of precipitation in 12 hours.

=== Hurricane Two ===
- Category 4 hurricane (SSHWS)
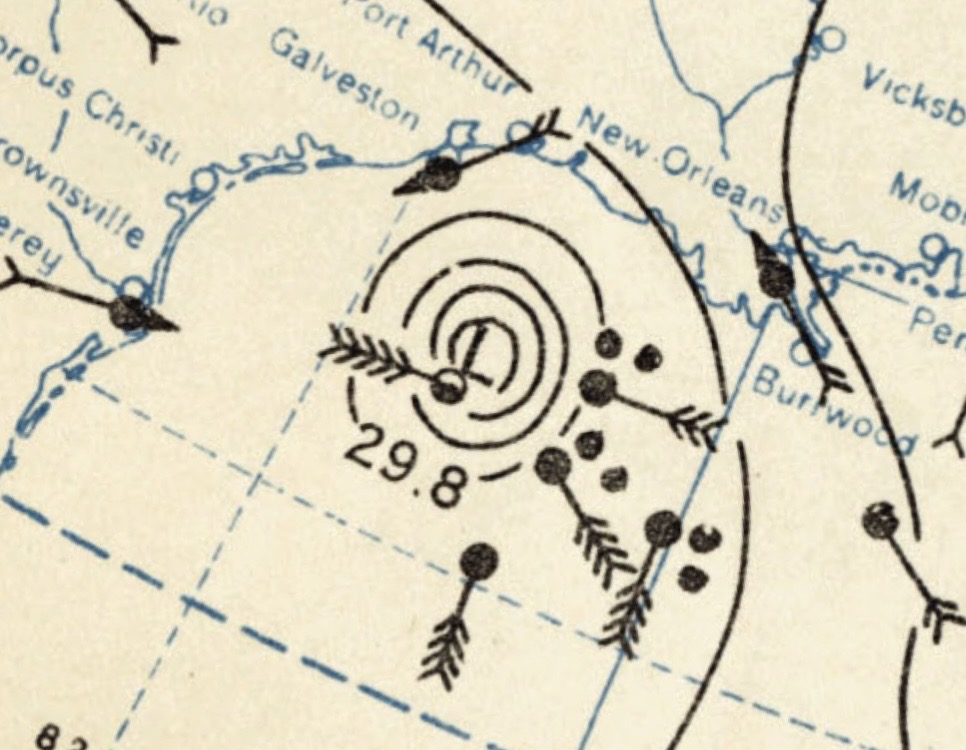
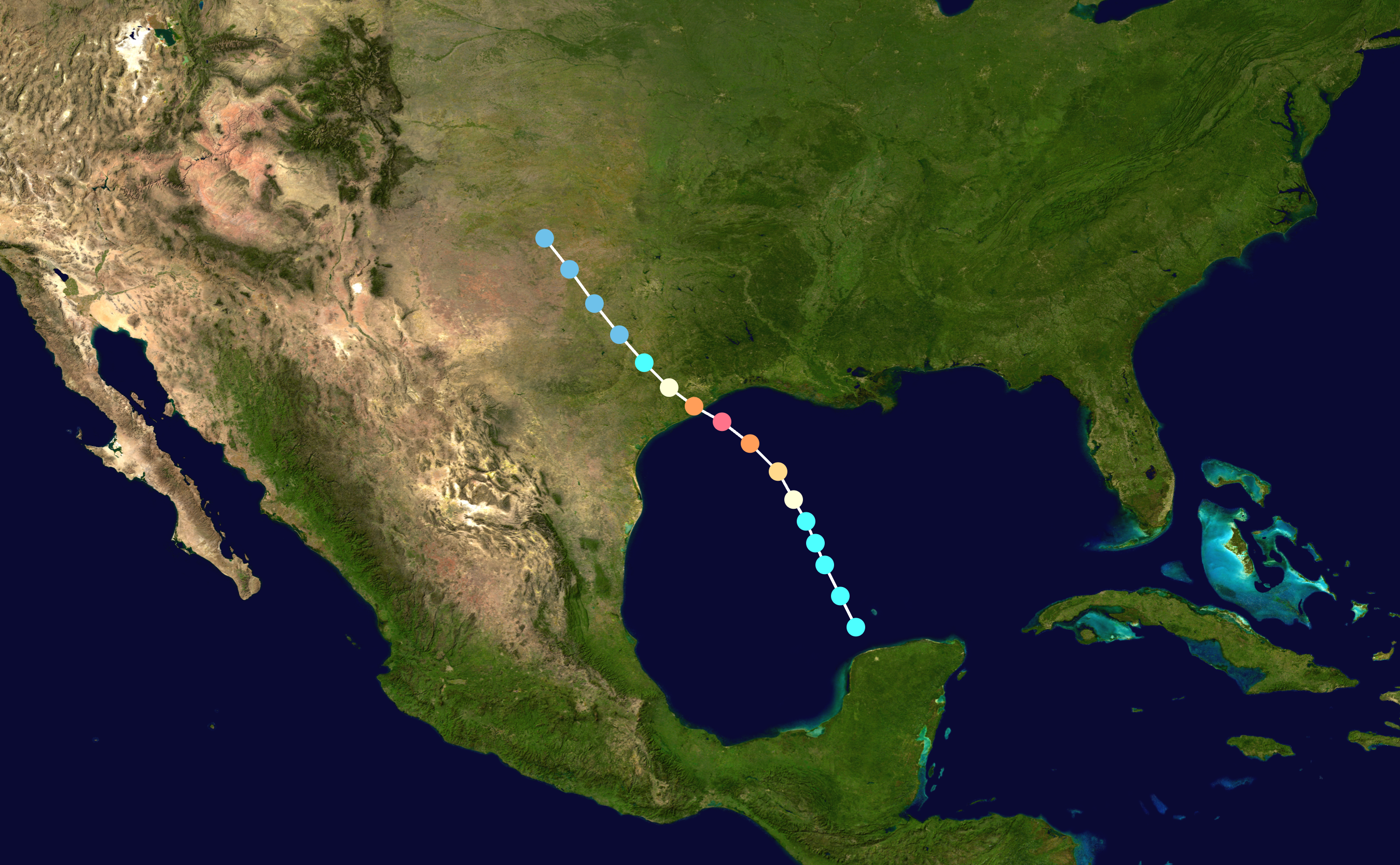
- Duration: August 12 – August 15
- Peak intensity: 150 mph (240 km/h) (1-min); 935 mbar (hPa)

A tropical disturbance developed into a tropical storm in the southern Gulf of Mexico near the Yucatán Peninsula early on August 12. Moving north-northwestward, the cyclone strengthened into a hurricane by early the next day. Thereafter, the storm rapidly intensified, becoming a Category 4 hurricane early on August 13. Strengthening slightly further, the compact hurricane attained its peak intensity with maximum sustained winds estimated at 150 mph (240 km/h) and a minimum barometric pressure of 935 mbar (27.6 inHg) shortly before making landfall near Freeport, Texas, at 04:00 UTC on August 13. The cyclone then rapidly weakened, falling below major hurricane intensity just eight hours later and to tropical storm intensity about fourteen hours after landfall. On August 15, the system deteriorated to a tropical depression, before dissipating over the Texas Panhandle around 18:00 UTC.

Official warning on the storm began just four hours prior to the storm's landfall in Texas, forcing many people evacuating inland to abandon their cars in high winds and heavy rains. In Galveston, power to electrical and phone service was cut off, temporarily reducing communications. The passage between Galveston Island and mainland Texas was flooded, briefly isolating Galveston. Heavy rains occurred, and a foot of rain fell as the storm moved north towards the coast. A total of 40 people were killed by the hurricane. The greatest single death toll for any town was seven in West Columbia, where sustained winds over 100 mph (160 km/h) flattened several homes. Two neighborhoods that had been constructed for oil industry workers there were nearly destroyed by the high tides and storm surge. Angleton, Freeport, and Galveston suffered extensive wind damage, while the inland towns of Brazoria, West Columbia, Damon and Needville, all in the path of the eye, were also devastated. Damages associated with the hurricane were estimated to total to $7.5 million.

=== Hurricane Three ===
- Category 1 hurricane (SSHWS)
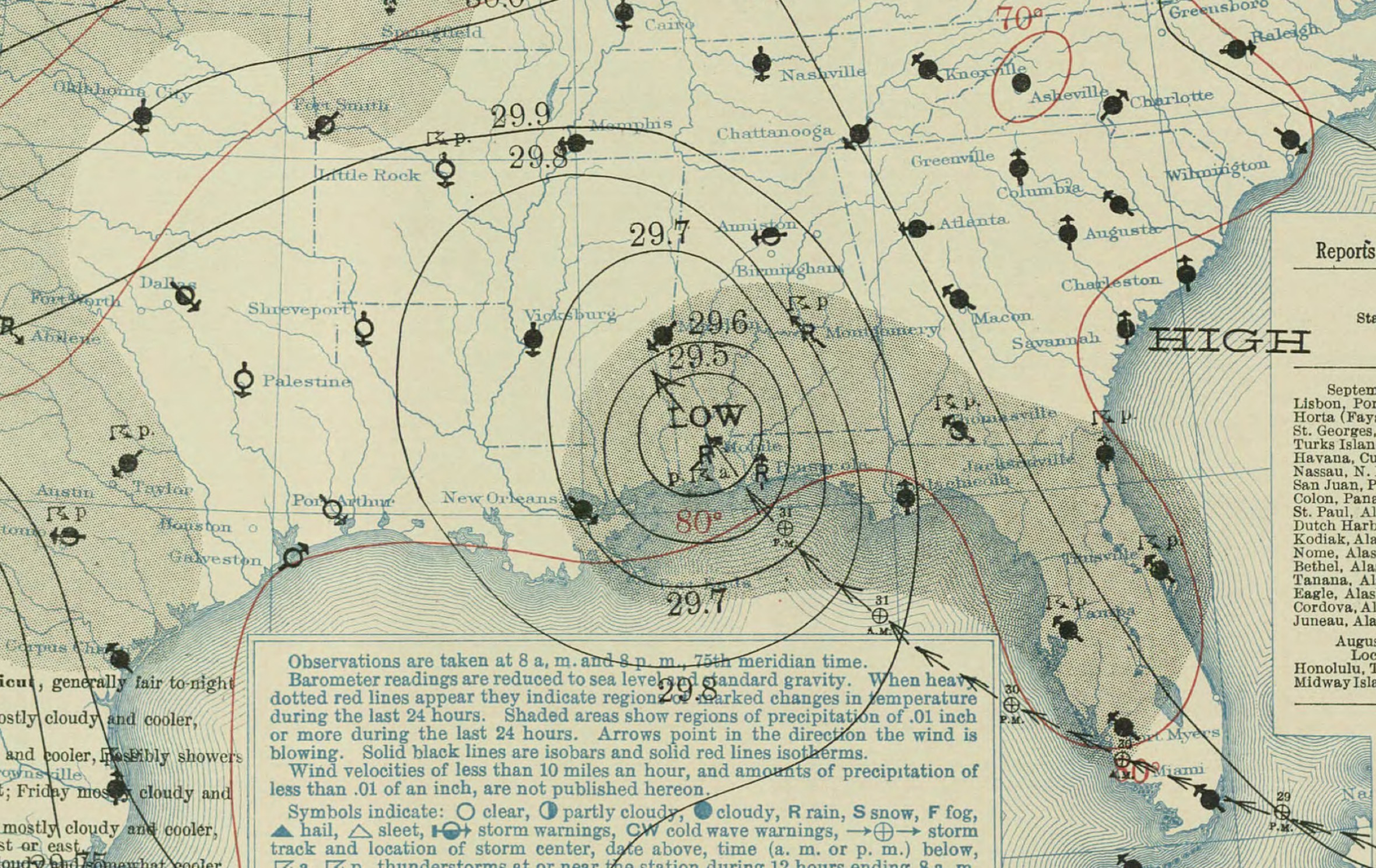
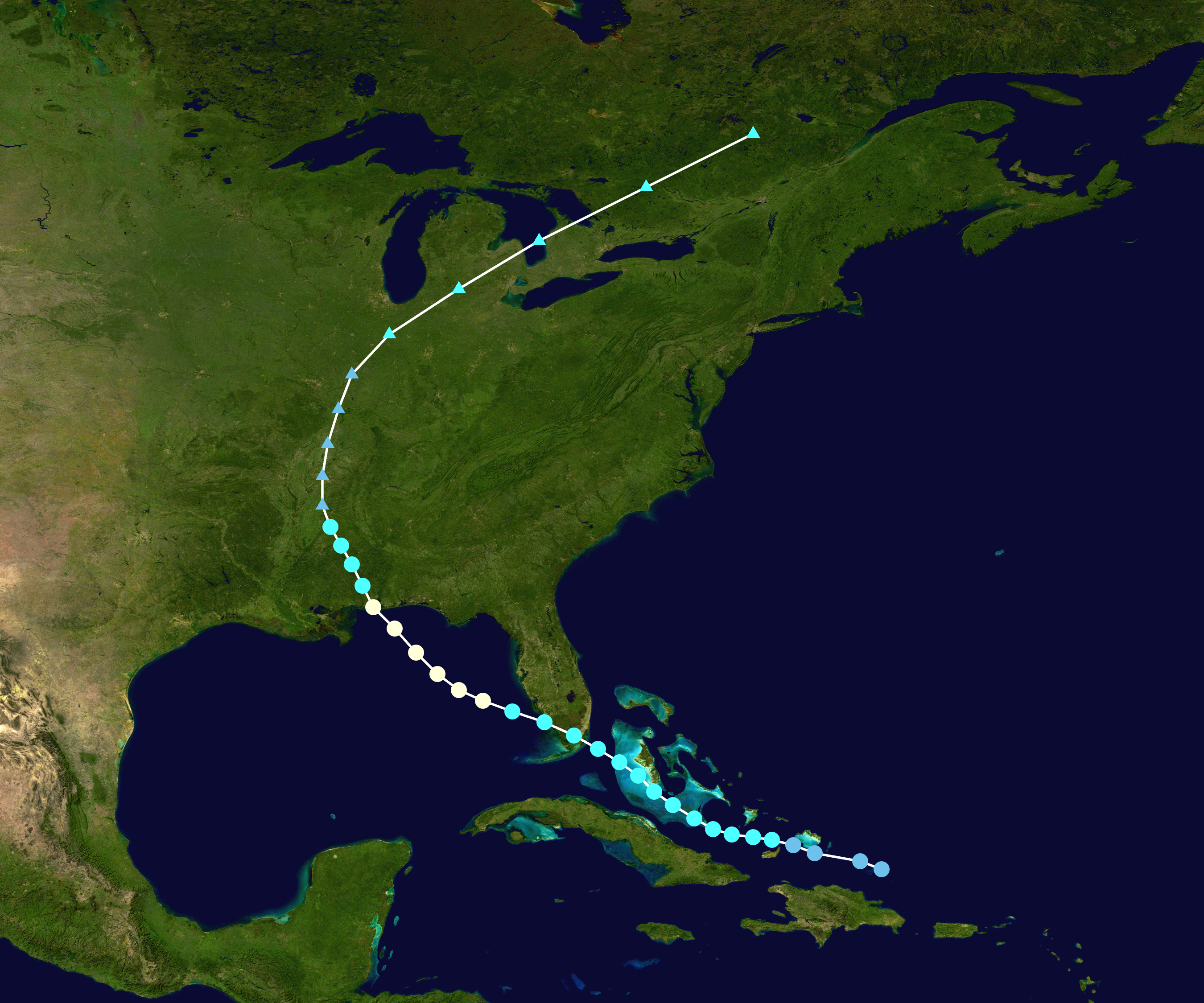
- Duration: August 26 – September 2
- Peak intensity: 85 mph (140 km/h) (1-min); 979 mbar (hPa)

A tropical disturbance was first identified southeast of Puerto Rico on August 24. Moving northwestward, the disturbance developed into a tropical depression two days later north of Hispaniola. Slowly moving towards the west-northwest, it intensified into a tropical storm late on August 27. The storm made landfall on the north end of Key Largo, Florida, with sustained winds of 65 mph (105 km/h) around 04:00 UTC on August 30, before striking the mainland south of Homestead. After crossing the Florida peninsula and entering the Gulf of Mexico, the system reached its peak intensity as a Category 1 hurricane with maximum sustained winds of 85 mph (137 km/h), before subsequently making its final landfall just east Mississippi–Alabama state line on September 1 at the same intensity. Over land, the hurricane weakened, and after becoming an extratropical cyclone over northwestern Mississippi on September 2, the storm merged with another extratropical system over Quebec on September 4.

At the storm's landfall in southern Florida, heavy rains and strong winds caused extensive damage to crops, particularly to avocado and citrus. A fire in Hollywood that firefighters were unable to extinguish due to winds damaging equipment led to approximately $20,000 in damage. As the strengthening hurricane moved northwestwards through the Gulf of Mexico, it generated strong surf that caused severe damage to coastal areas across western Florida, before making its second landfall, where it produced hurricane-force winds across a wide swath of the coast. In and around Pensacola, the hurricane caused about $100,000 in damage, including impacts to buildings, homes, waterfront properties, power lines, and cotton crops. Agricultural lands in coastal regions of Mississippi and Alabama were damaged by strong winds and heavy rain. Storm surge also submerged portions of Bayou La Batre and Mobile in Alabama, with about $105,000 in damage in the latter. The hurricane caused one death and about $229,000 in total damages across its path.

=== Hurricane Four ===
- Category 5 hurricane (SSHWS)
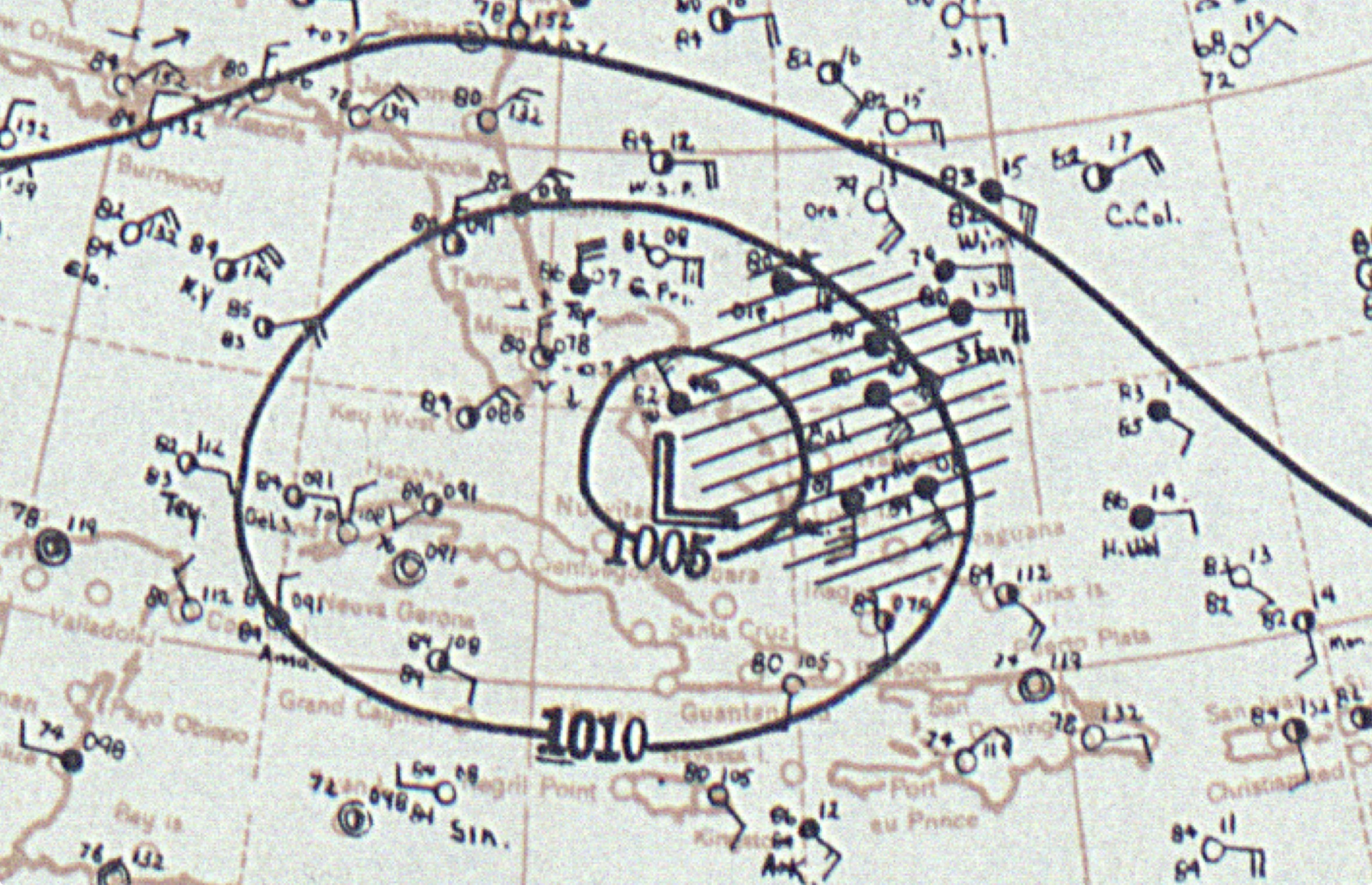
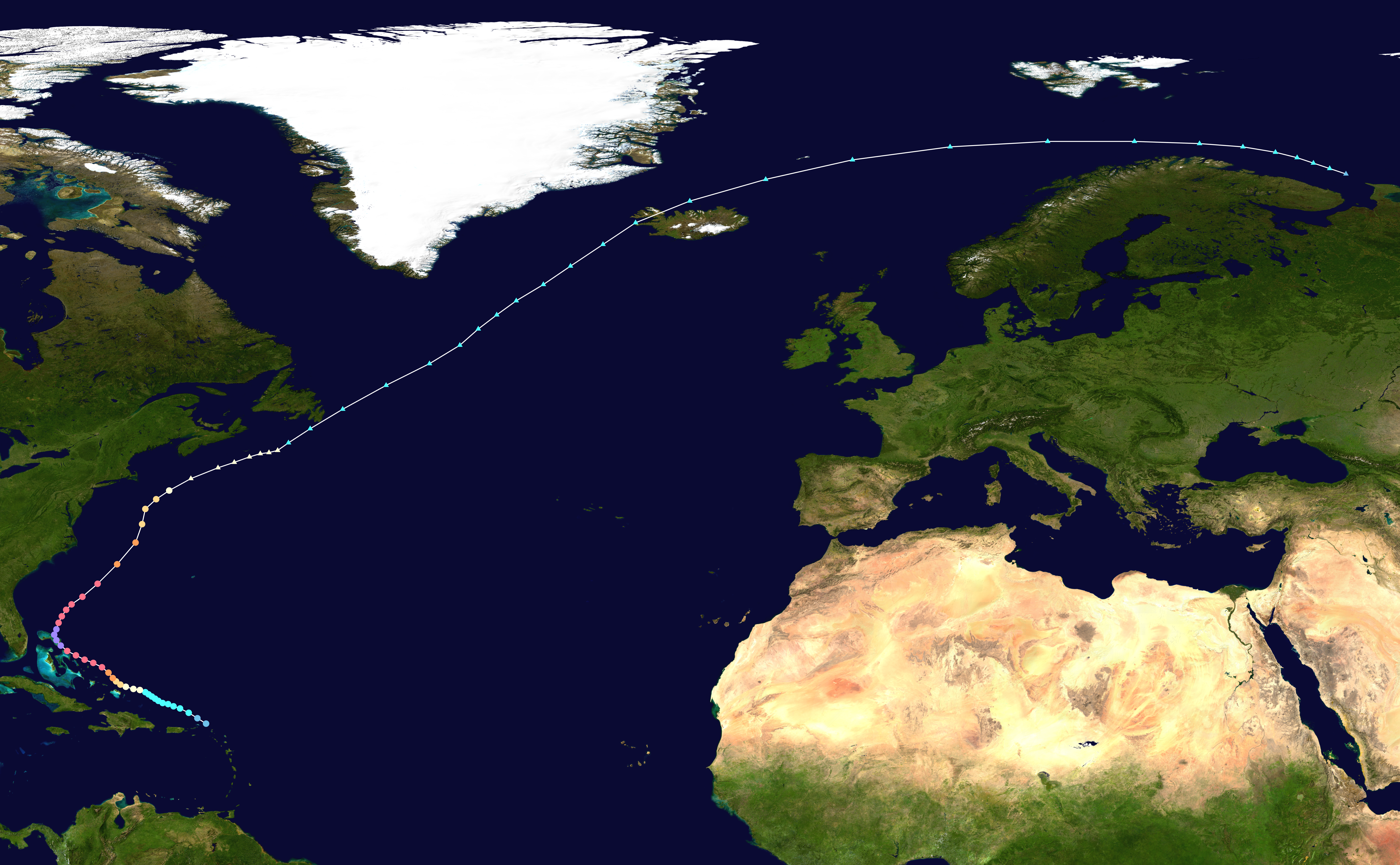
- Duration: August 30 – September 9
- Peak intensity: 160 mph (260 km/h) (1-min); ≤931 mbar (hPa)

A tropical depression was first detected north of the Virgin Islands late on August 30. Moving towards the west-northwest, the depression steadily intensified, reaching tropical storm strength and later hurricane strength on September 2, as it passed near the Turks and Caicos Islands. After reaching hurricane intensity, the hurricane began to rapidly intensify, becoming a major hurricane on September 4. The intensifying hurricane moved through the Bahamas and reached its peak intensity as a Category 5 hurricane, the first of the season, with maximum sustained winds of 160 mph (260 km/h) at 18:00 UTC on September 5. Shortly thereafter, the hurricane struck the Abaco Islands. Curving north-northeastward, the cyclone slowly weakened, falling to Category 4 intensity by late on September 6. The storm continued weakening as it accelerated northeastward, bypassing New England before becoming extratropical about 150 mi (240 km) south of Cape Sable Island on September 9. The extratropical cyclone brushed Newfoundland and traversed across Iceland and later dissipated just offshore Russia's Kola Peninsula on September 17.

The hurricane caused extensive devastation across much of the Bahamas, where it killed 16 people and injured an additional 300 people. Strong winds destroyed numerous homes and hampered water and food supplies. The large hurricane also generated a strong storm surge which inundated the Abaco Islands. The Abaco Islands were the worst impacted area, where the severity of damage indicated that sustained wind speeds exceeded 150 mph (240 km/h). At Hope Town, the hurricane demolished 83 homes, severely damaged 63 others, and damaged 40 others to a lesser degree. Strong winds also destroyed all churches and public buildings in the community. Similarly, all buildings – including churches, government buildings, and schools – and homes were demolished on Green Turtle Cay. Only six homes remained standing in Coopers Town and just four others withstood the hurricane at Great Guana Cay. The hurricane also completely destroyed the Bluff Point community. Most homes in Marsh Harbour were severely damaged, while the cyclone destroyed 12 other homes and all schools in the town. Effects in the United States were much less severe, due to the distance of the hurricane. However, strong gales still swept through much of New England. In Atlantic Canada, the storm caused 14 or 15 deaths, all related to maritime incidents. On land, wind gusts reached 81 mph (130 km/h) in Halifax, Nova Scotia. Some homes and buildings were damaged or destroyed, while approximately 10 percent of apple crops in Annapolis Valley were lost.

=== Tropical Storm Five ===
- Tropical storm (SSHWS)
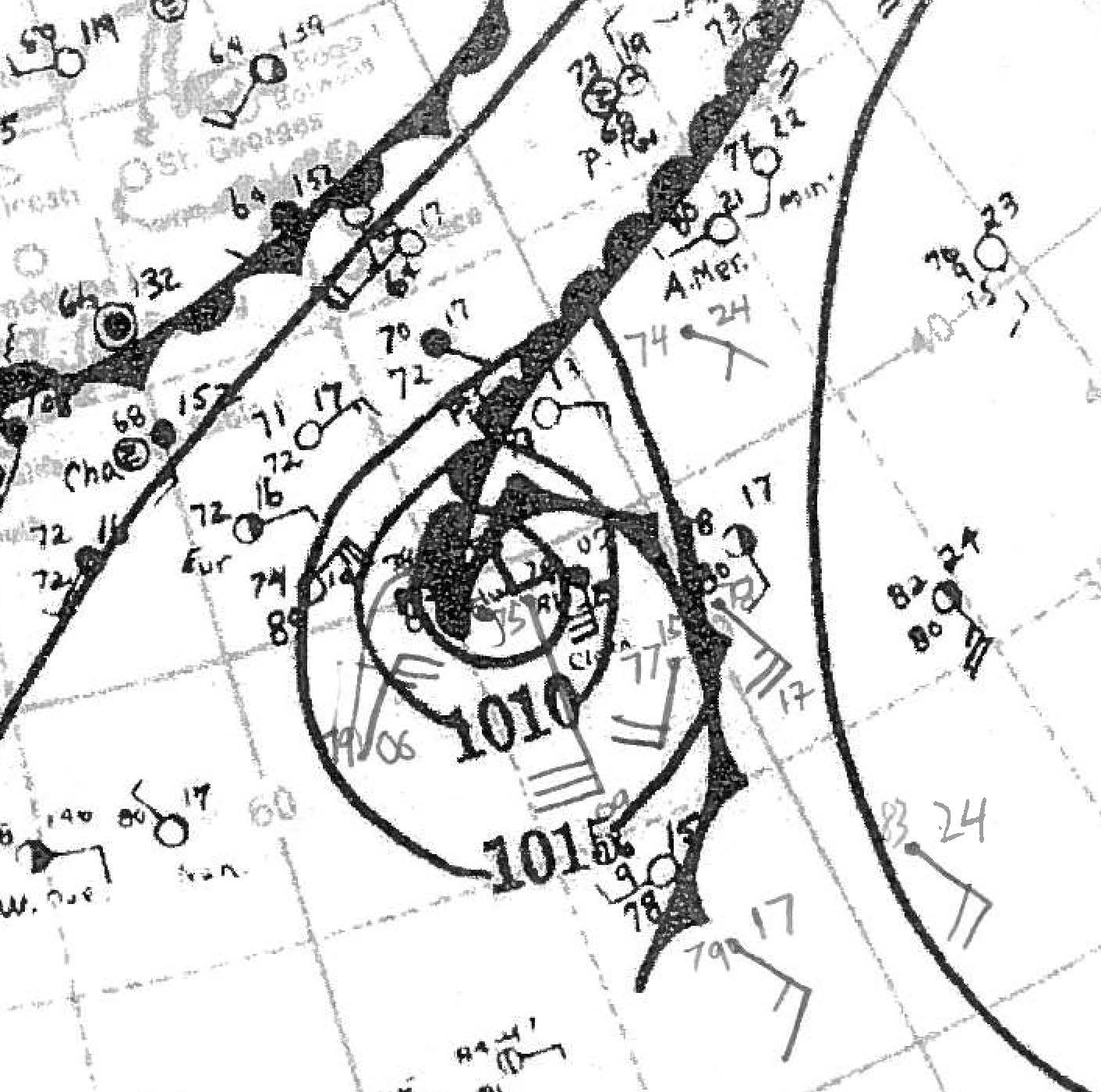
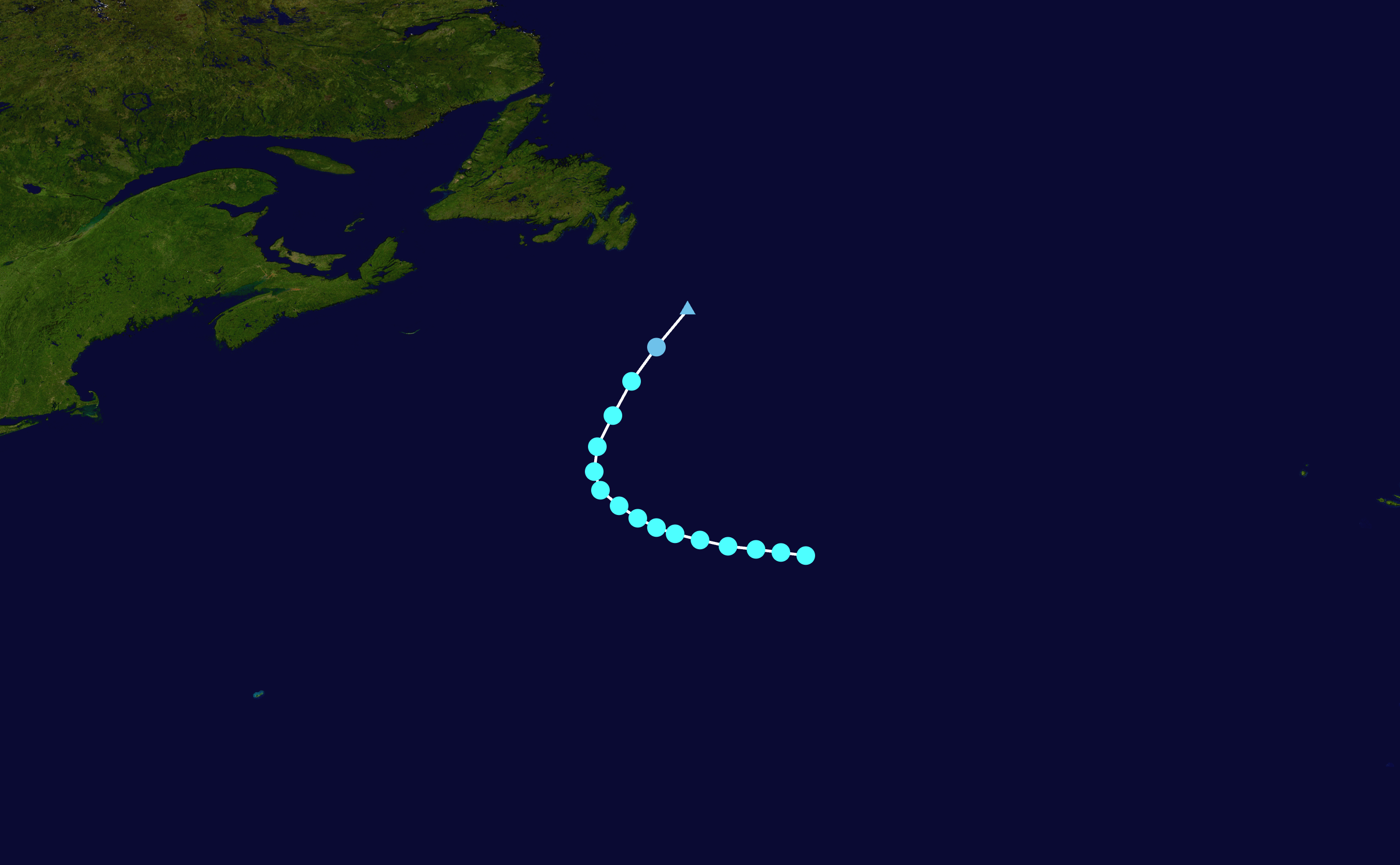
- Duration: September 4 – September 7
- Peak intensity: 70 mph (110 km/h) (1-min); 992 mbar (hPa)

On September 4, an area of low pressure developed from a stationary front approximately 740 mi (1,190 km) south-southeast of Cape Race, Newfoundland. At the time, a warm front and cold front were connected to the system, but further observations revealed minimal temperature deviations. The following day, the disturbance appeared to have acquired subtropical characteristics, but became tropical after observations showed that winds associated with the storm were near the center. The system peaked as a strong tropical storm with maximum sustained winds of 70 mph (110 km/h) on September 5. The storm later weakened and was absorbed by a frontal boundary at 18:00 UTC on September 7 roughly 165 mi (265 km) southeast of Cape Race.

=== Tropical Storm Six ===
- Tropical storm (SSHWS)
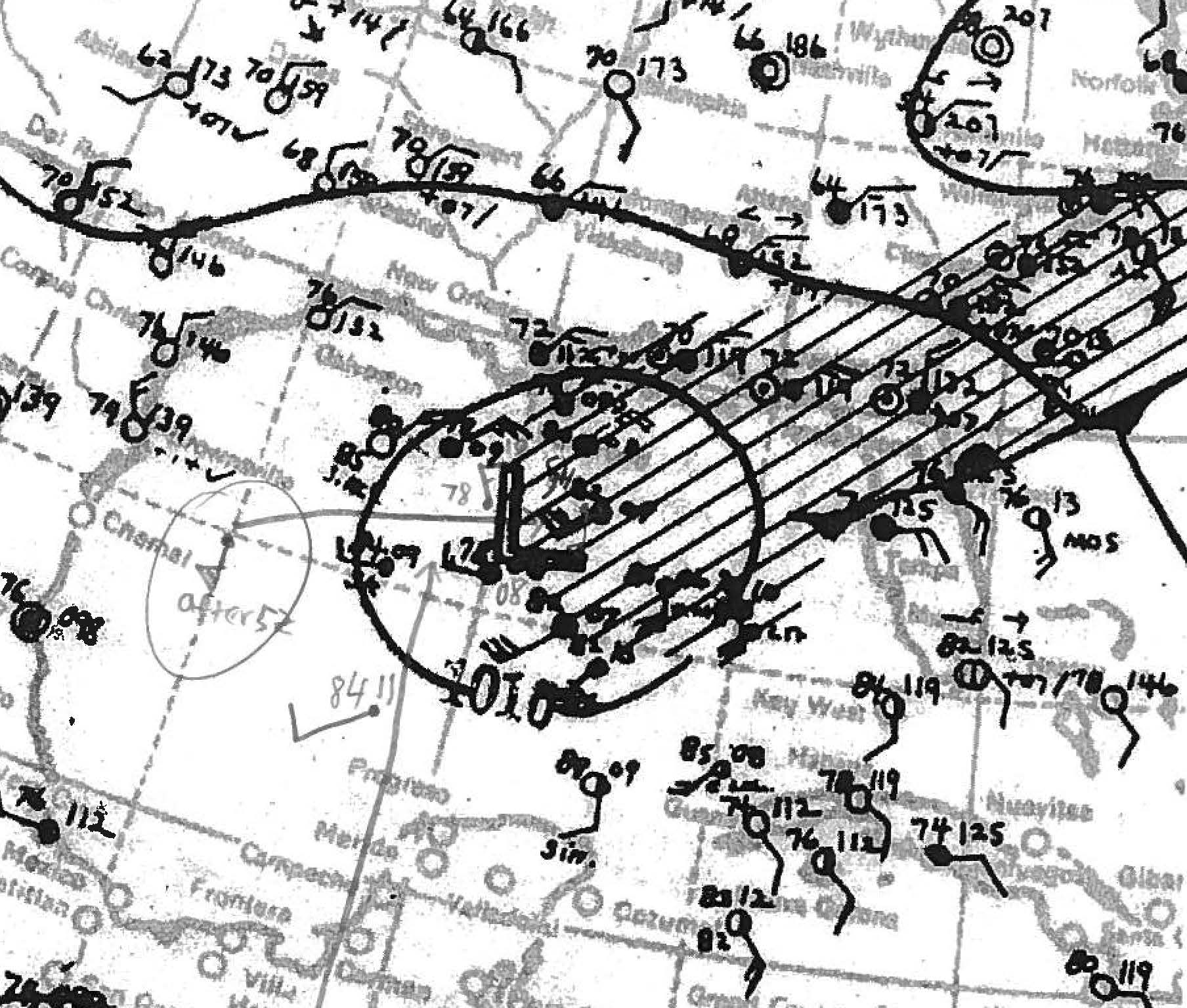
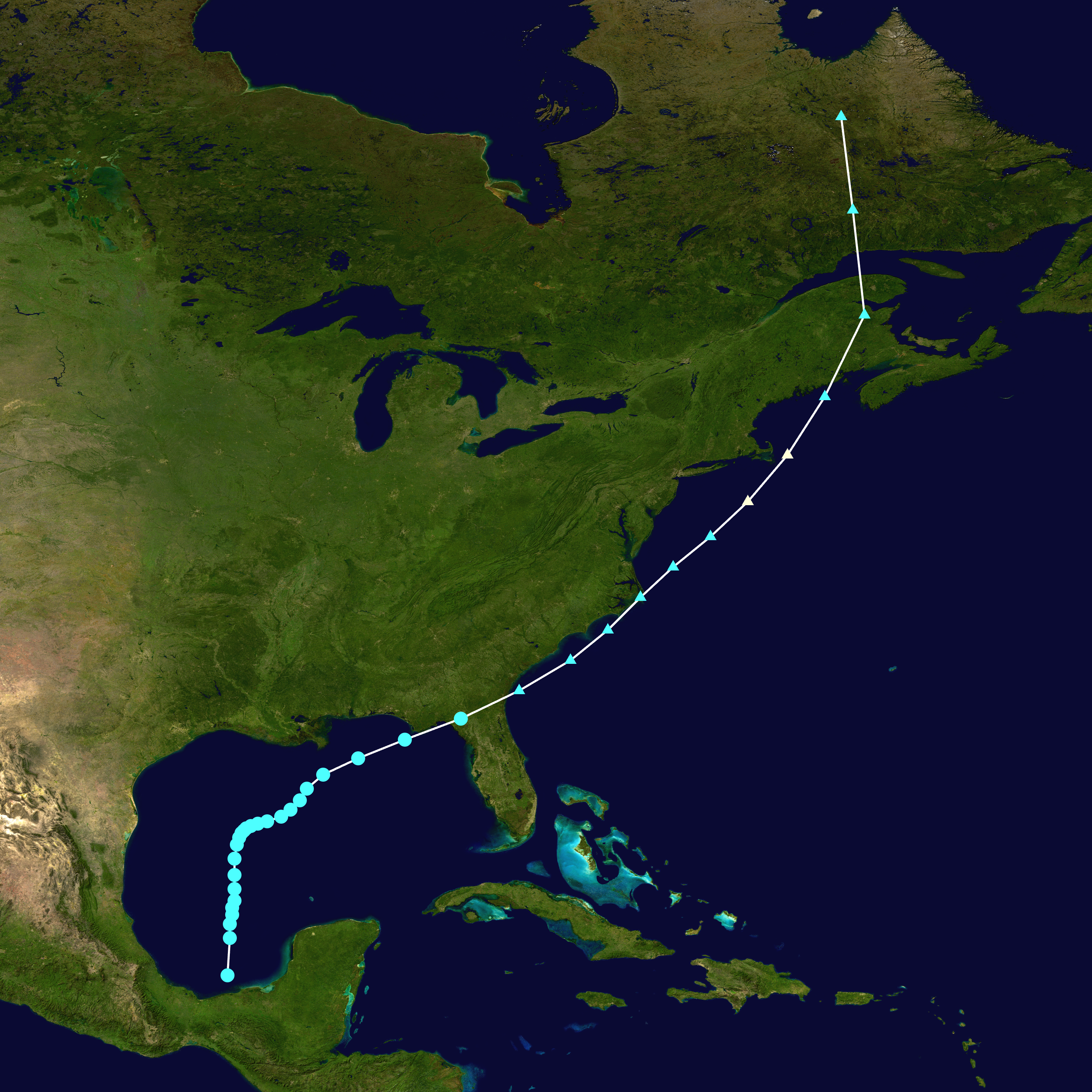
- Duration: September 9 – September 15
- Peak intensity: 60 mph (95 km/h) (1-min); 999 mbar (hPa)

A tropical storm formed in the Bay of Campeche on September 9. Moving slowly northwards, the storm reached its peak intensity with maximum sustained winds of 60 mph (95 km/h) while located south of the Mississippi River Delta. Beginning on September 14, the storm began to accelerate as it turned towards the northeast. Around 04:00 UTC on September 15, the cyclone made landfall in St. Marks, Florida, at peak intensity. The storm crossed the state quickly and briefly entered Georgia before emerging into the Atlantic less than eight hours after landfall. However, the system soon transitioned into an extratropical cyclone a short distance east of Sapelo Island around 12:00 UTC on September 15. The extratropical cyclone quickly accelerated parallel to the United States East Coast, before being absorbed by another extratropical system over Quebec.

The storm's quick passage over the Florida peninsula left relatively minor damage. A train crossed over a washout on its railroad, causing it to derail. In Apalachicola, there was considerable damage to crops, and torrential rains caused $2,000 in damages. Electric power in the city was also disabled, and some buildings suffered structural damage, totaling to $8,000 in damages. Tallahassee observed 5.61 in (142 mm) of precipitation. In Georgia, Thomasville and Valdosta experienced "high winds and considerable rainfall," according to the Tallahassee Democrat. A few weather stations along the East Coast of the United States recorded sustained tropical storm force winds, including Hatteras, North Carolina; Atlantic City, New Jersey; and New York City, New York. There were scattered reports of wind damage across Atlantic Canada, including the toppling of telephone and electrical wires, and the deroofing of buildings and homes. In Nova Scotia, Annapolis Valley lost approximately 75% of its apple crops. The storm also left maritime impacts, damaging or destroying docks, wharves, and boats. At least one death occurred in Canada, while eight other people went missing along with their vessel.

=== Tropical Storm Seven ===
- Tropical storm (SSHWS)
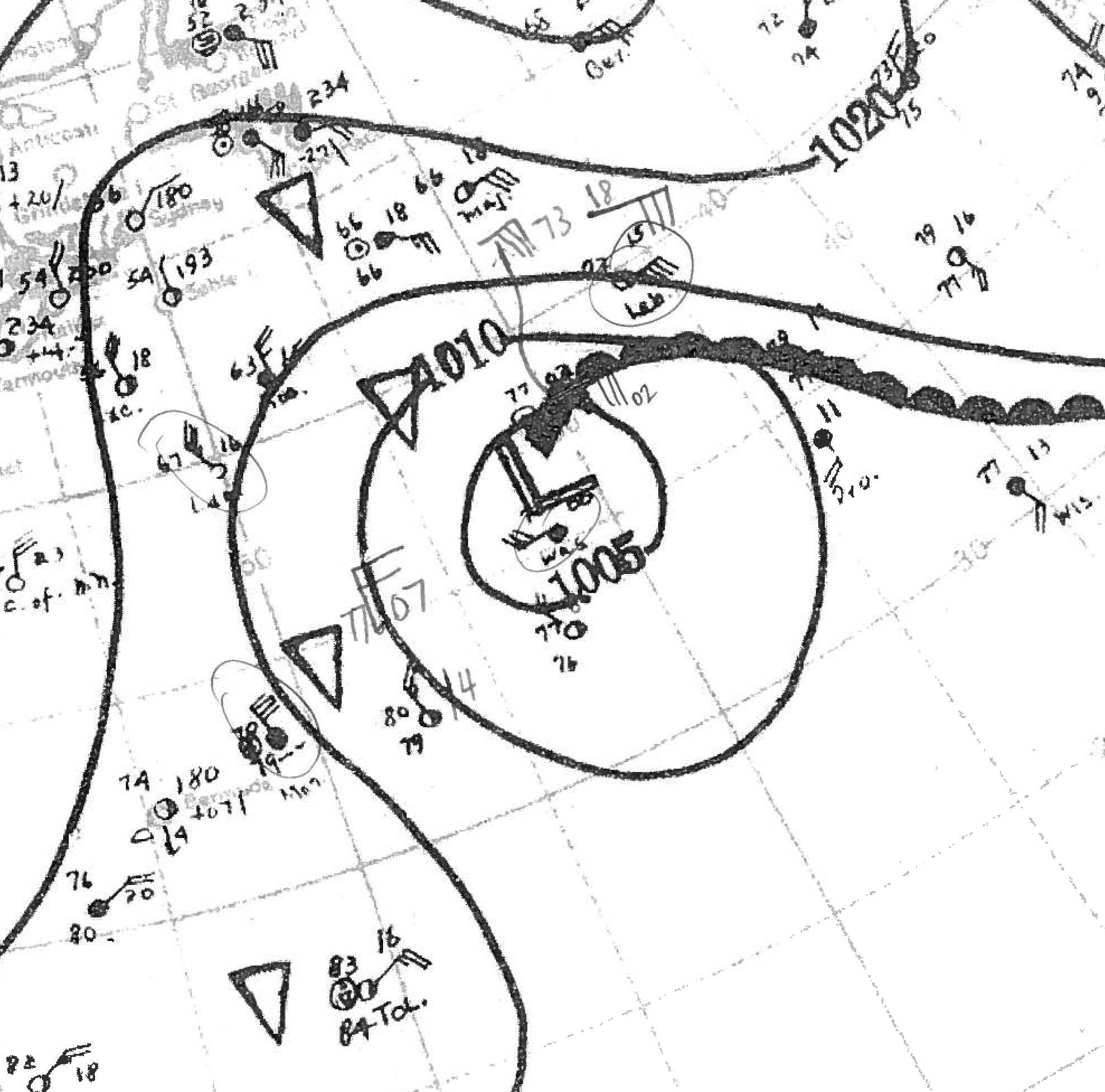
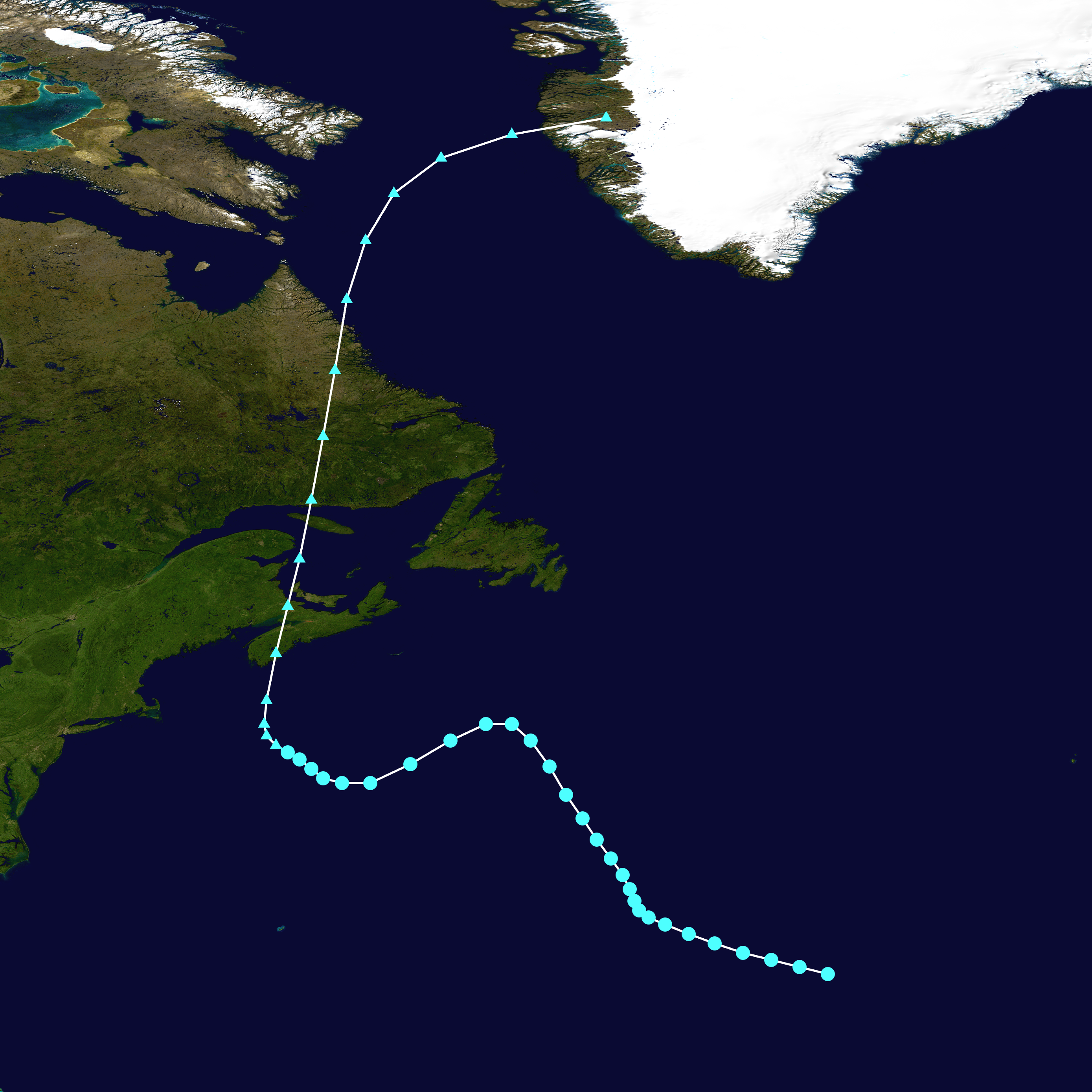
- Duration: September 16 – September 23
- Peak intensity: 65 mph (100 km/h) (1-min); 994 mbar (hPa)

On September 16, a tropical storm with winds of 40 mph (64 km/h) developed out of a frontal boundary about 860 mi (1,385 km) southwest of the northwesternmost islands of the Azores. Moving slowly towards the northwest, gales were reported by ships in the region as the cyclone slowly intensified. On September 20, the storm began to move towards the southwest. The system reached peak intensity on September 21, with winds of 65 mph (105 km/h), before transitioning into an extratropical cyclone about halfway between Bermuda and Nova Scotia as it recurved northwards on September 23. The extratropical cyclone later made landfall on Nova Scotia the following day, before dissipating over southern Greenland on September 26. Sustained winds in Atlantic Canada peaked at 29 mph (47 km/h) on Resolution Island in Nunavut.

=== Tropical Storm Eight ===
- Tropical storm (SSHWS)
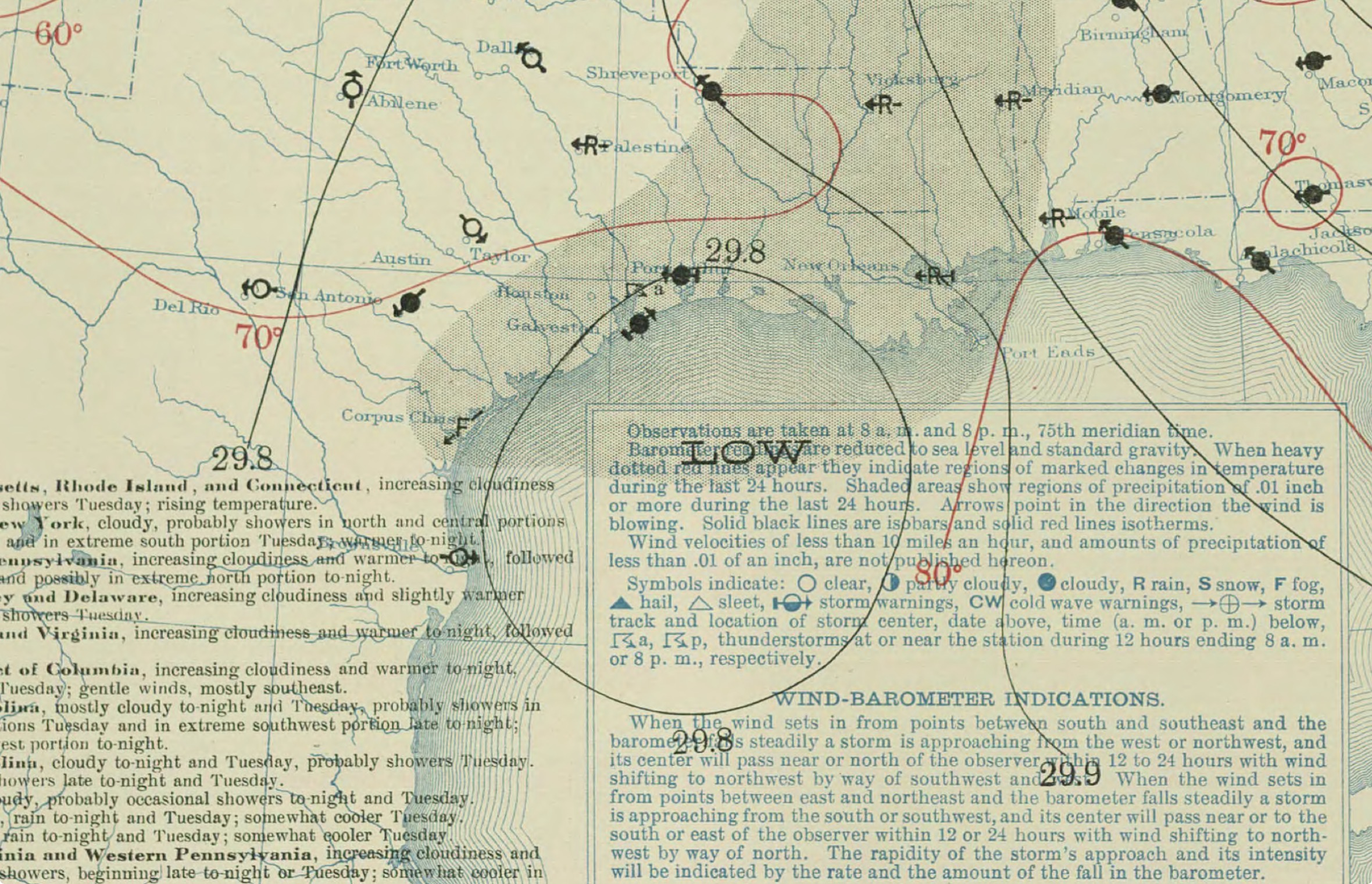
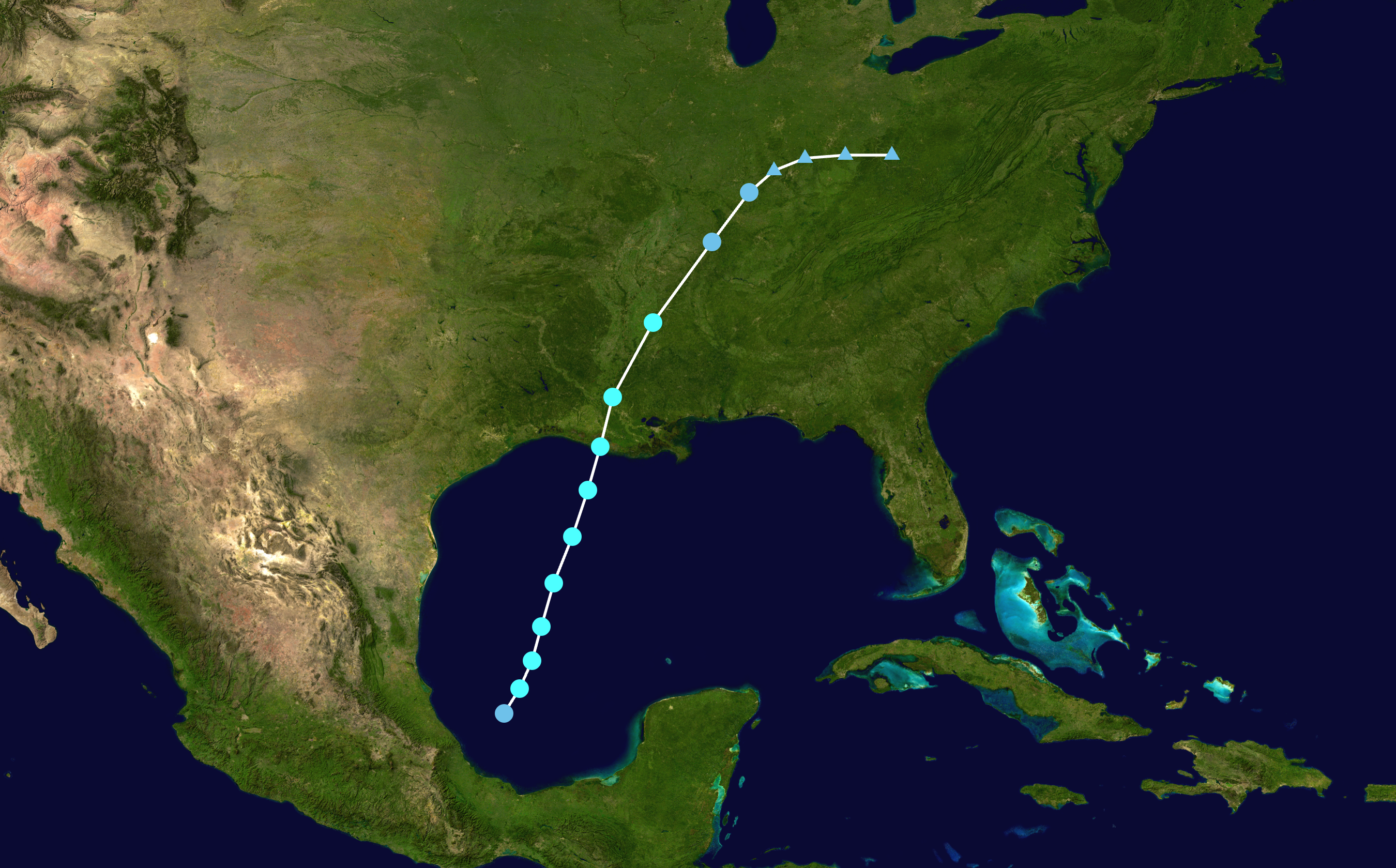
- Duration: September 18 – September 20
- Peak intensity: 65 mph (100 km/h) (1-min); 998 mbar (hPa)

Another tropical depression was first identified on September 18 in the Bay of Campeche. Moving quickly towards the north-northeast, the depression intensified to a tropical storm and reached peak intensity with maximum sustained winds of 65 mph (105 km/h) and a minimum barometric pressure of 998 mbar (29.5 inHg) early the next day. The storm subsequently made landfall near Morgan City, Louisiana, at 19:00 UTC on September 19. Weakening over land, the tropical storm degenerated to a tropical depression at 12:00 UTC on September 20, before becoming extratropical the next day just west of Louisville, Kentucky, and later dissipating after it was absorbed by an approaching frontal system over southern Ohio late on September 21.

Since the storm made landfall in a sparsely populated region of Louisiana, only minimal damage was reported. Prior to the storm's landfall, however, hedge selling of cotton were offset in late dealings caused by fears of the storm's potential impact. Tropical storm-force winds damaged some fishing shacks in southwestern Louisiana. A tornado was reported in West Baton Rouge Parish, blowing down sugarcane along a path 8 mi (13 km) long. Another tornado in Gulfport, Mississippi, damaged half a dozen homes and injured three people. Farther inland, heavy rains associated with the system were reported, peaking at 3.01 in (76 mm) in Vicksburg.

=== Hurricane Nine ===
- Category 4 hurricane (SSHWS)
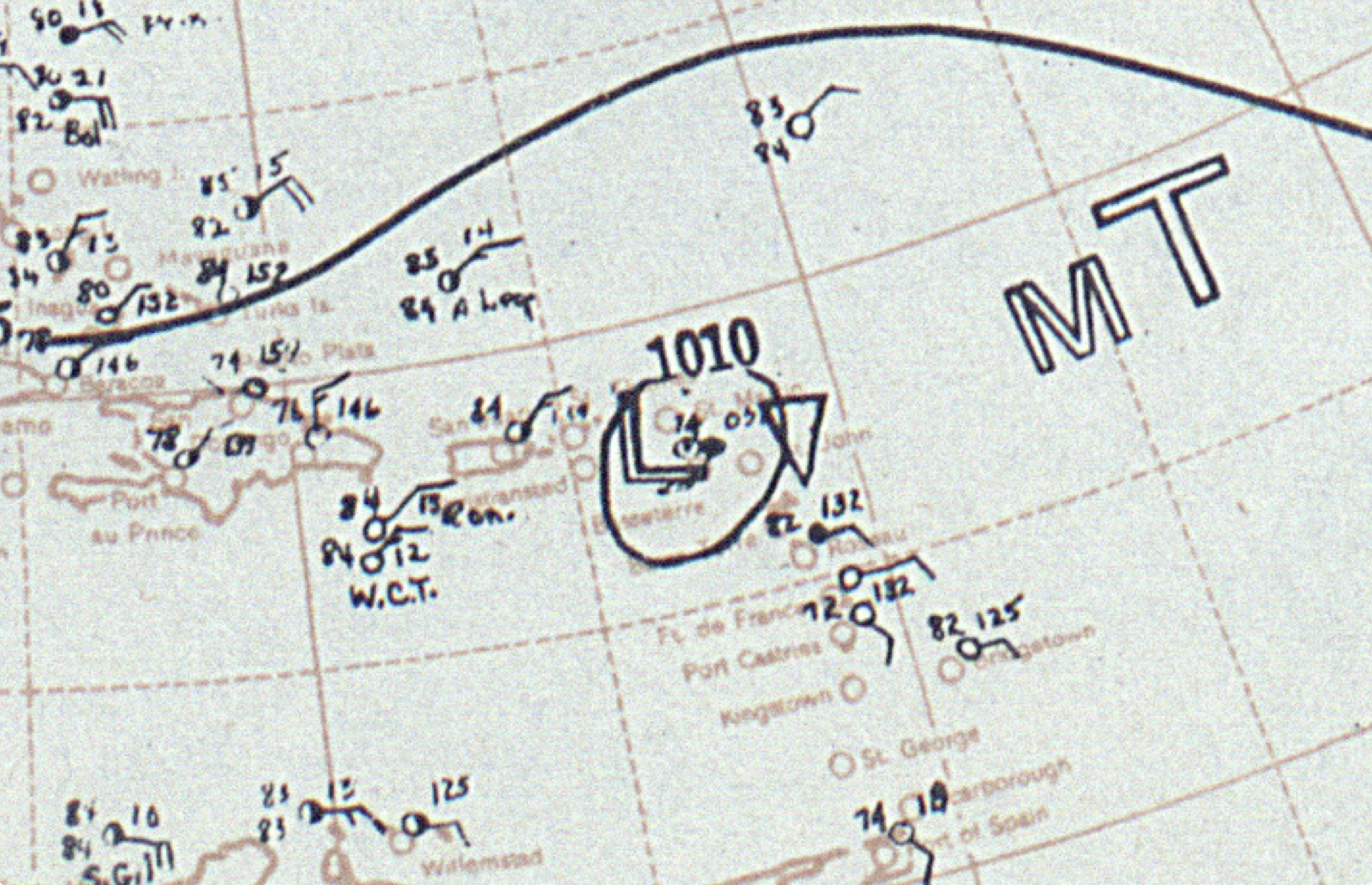
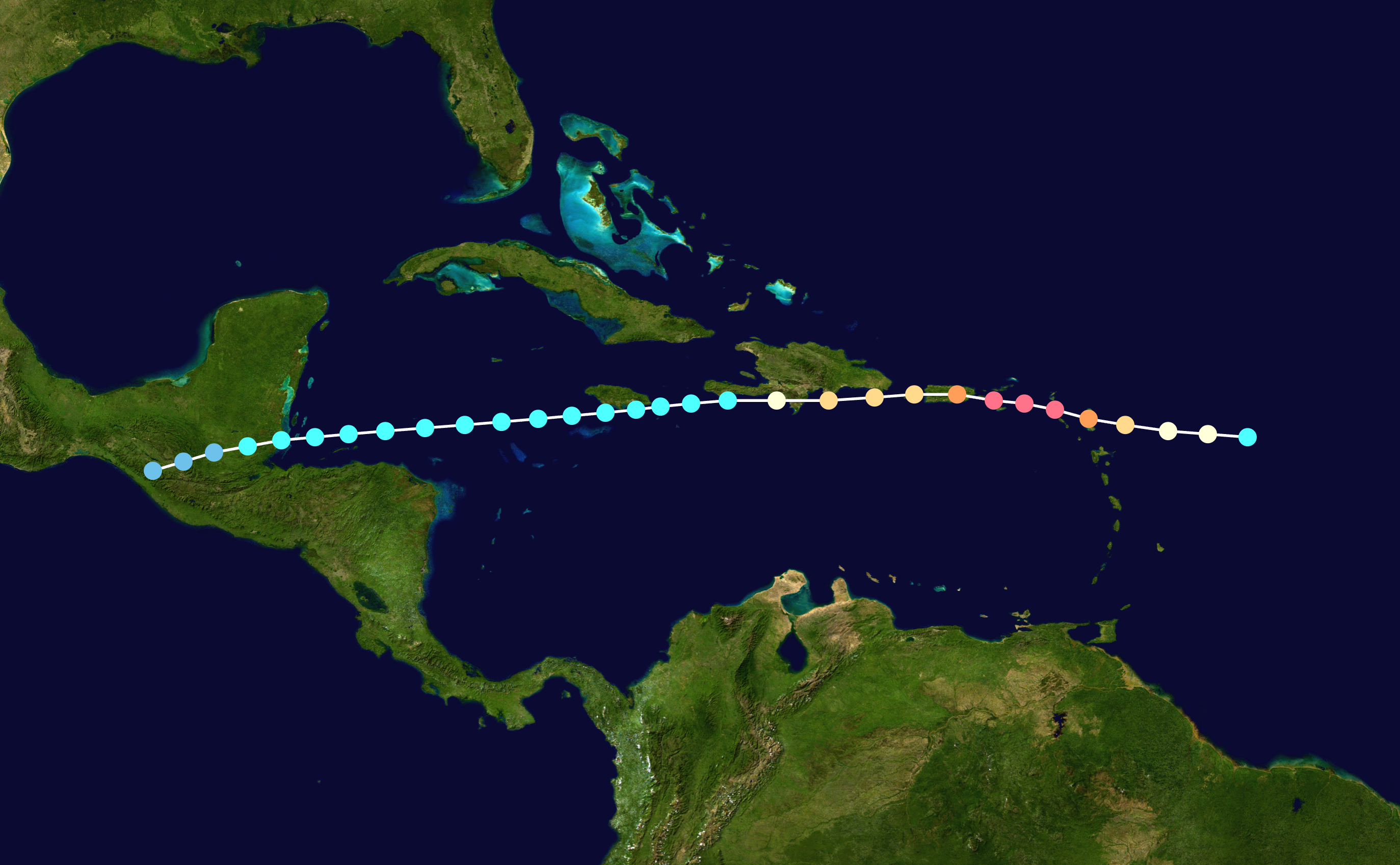
- Duration: September 25 – October 2
- Peak intensity: 145 mph (230 km/h) (1-min); 943 mbar (hPa)

On September 25, ships first noted a tropical storm east of the Leeward Islands. The storm quickly intensified as it moved towards the west due to a nearby high pressure system, reaching hurricane strength at 12:00 UTC that day. As it approached Puerto Rico, the hurricane continued to rapidly intensify, before reaching its peak intensity as a Category 4 hurricane with winds of 145 mph (233 km/h) and a minimum pressure of 943 mbar (27.8 inHg) on September 27, before making landfall near Ceiba, Puerto Rico, at 03:00 UTC. The hurricane slightly weakened over the island, and after crossing the Mona Passage, made a second landfall in southern areas of the Dominican Republic as a Category 2 hurricane. Its passage of Hispaniola significantly weakened the hurricane, downgrading it to tropical strength on September 28. After brushing Jamaica to the south, the storm remained weak as it traversed the Caribbean. The cyclone made landfall in British Honduras between Hopkins and Placencia with winds of 45 mph (72 km/h) late on October 1. Thereafter, the storm quickly weakened and dissipated over southeastern Mexico on October 3.

On Barbuda, the hurricane damaged many buildings and homes, with more than 60 destroyed. Rainfall totals exceeding 8 in (200 mm) severely damaged many roads throughout Montserrat. Possibly due to the storm's small size, sustained wind speeds reached only 60 mph (97 km/h) on Saint Croix and Saint Thomas, while Saint Barthélemy experienced sustained winds between 60 and 85 mph (97 and 137 km/h). On Saint Thomas, winds downed wires and trees and damaged homes. The storm also capsized ships in Saint Thomas harbor and at Tortola. Property damage on Saint Thomas alone exceeded $200,000, while 15 fatalities were reported. Most of the damage caused by the San Ciprián hurricane occurred in Puerto Rico, particularly along the island's northern half, with the cyclone drawing comparisons to the 1928 Okeechobee hurricane. The powerful winds destroyed numerous buildings. More than 40,000 homes were demolished, rendering 25,000 families homeless. Winds also knocked out communications systems, hampering relief efforts. Heavy losses were incurred to crops, particularly to citrus and coffee. The hurricane caused 257 deaths and injured 4,820 other people, while inflicting about $35.6 million in damage. Economic losses related to the hurricane amounted to about 20 percent of Puerto Rico's gross income. Significant damage to agriculture occurred in the Dominican Republic. Impacts in Jamaica and British Honduras were minimal.

=== Tropical Storm Ten ===
- Tropical storm (SSHWS)
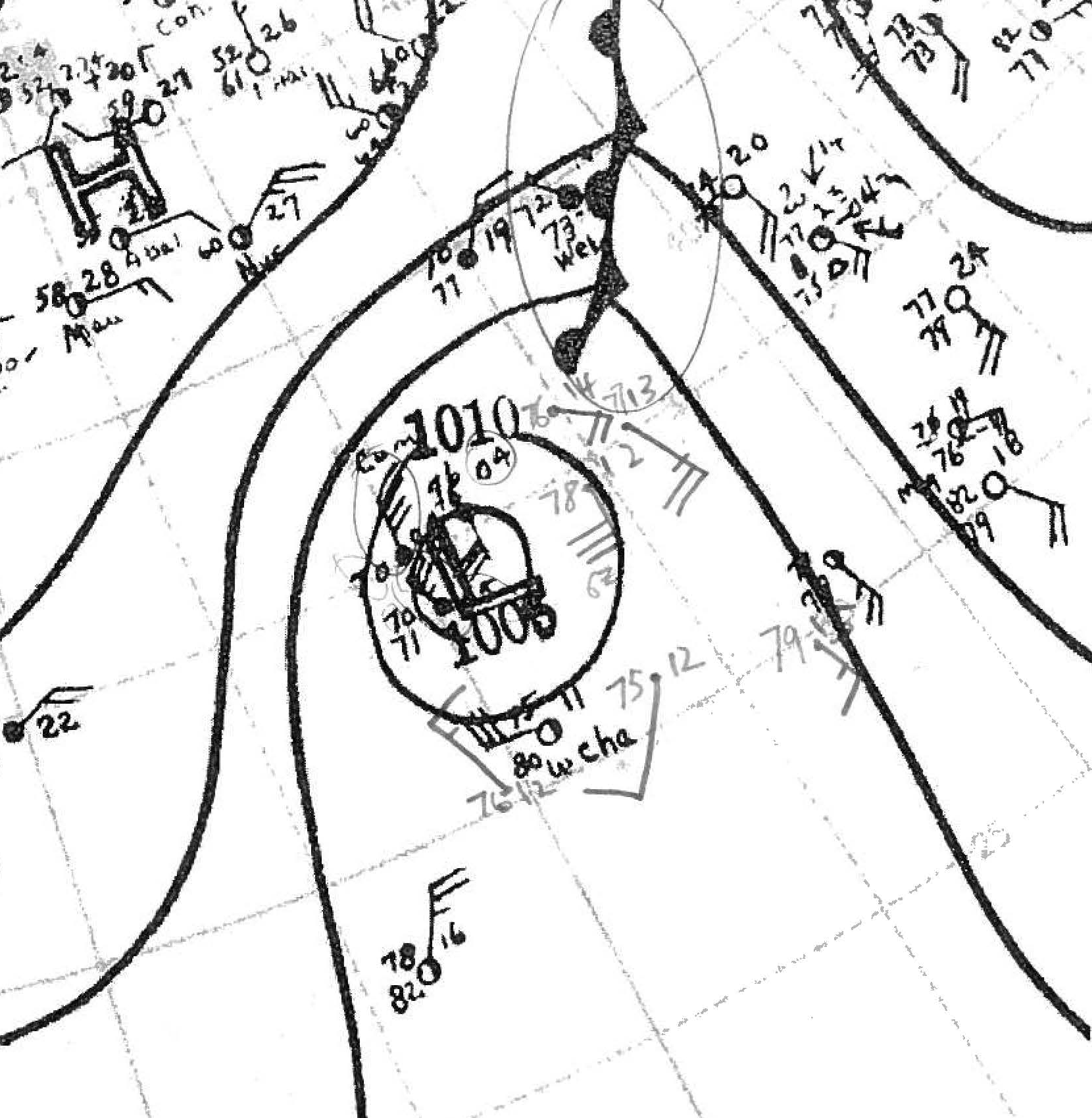
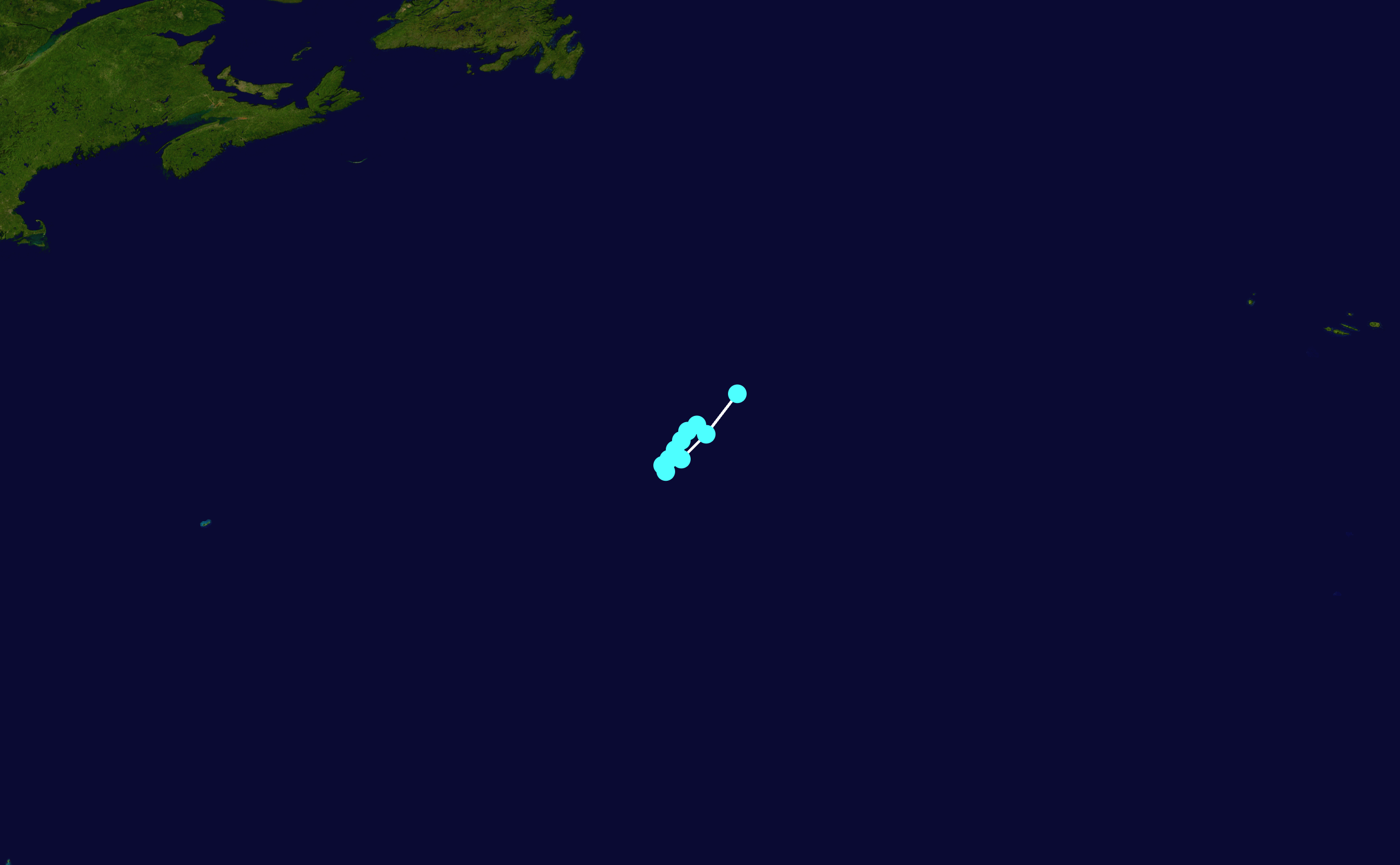
- Duration: September 28 – September 30
- Peak intensity: 45 mph (75 km/h) (1-min); 1004 mbar (hPa)

A tropical storm was first identified in the eastern Atlantic on September 28 as a small, compact system, with winds of 40 mph (64 km/h) and a minimum pressure of 1,004 mbar (29.6 inHg). Initially situated roughly 800 mi (1,285 km) south-southeast of Cape Race, Newfoundland, the storm moved southeastward and intensified slightly to peak with maximum sustained winds of 45 mph (72 km/h). Thereafter, the storm interacted with an extratropical cyclone which pulled it to the northwest. The extratropical cyclone later absorbed the system at 06:00 UTC on September 30 near its location of development.

=== Tropical Storm Eleven ===
- Tropical storm (SSHWS)
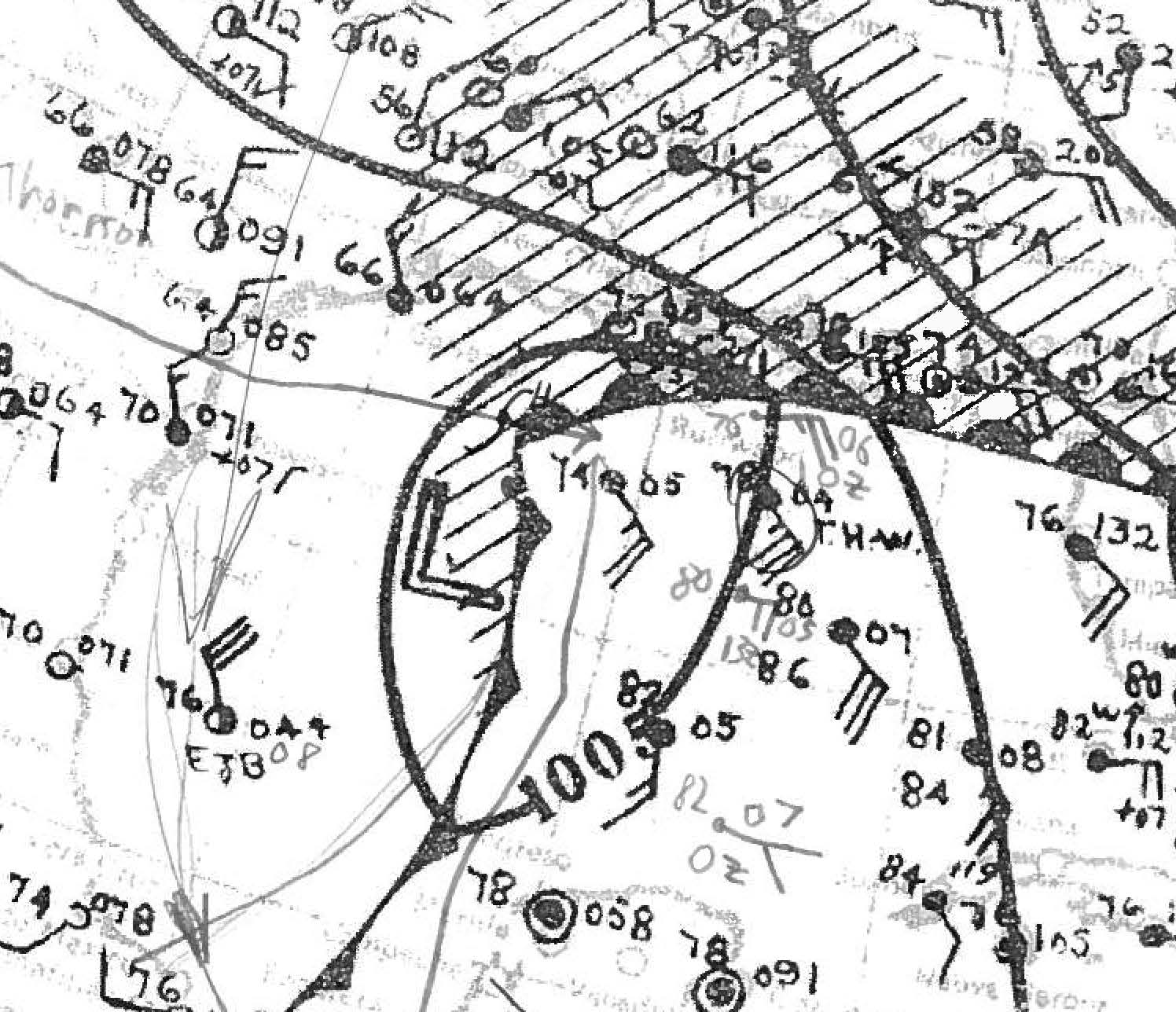
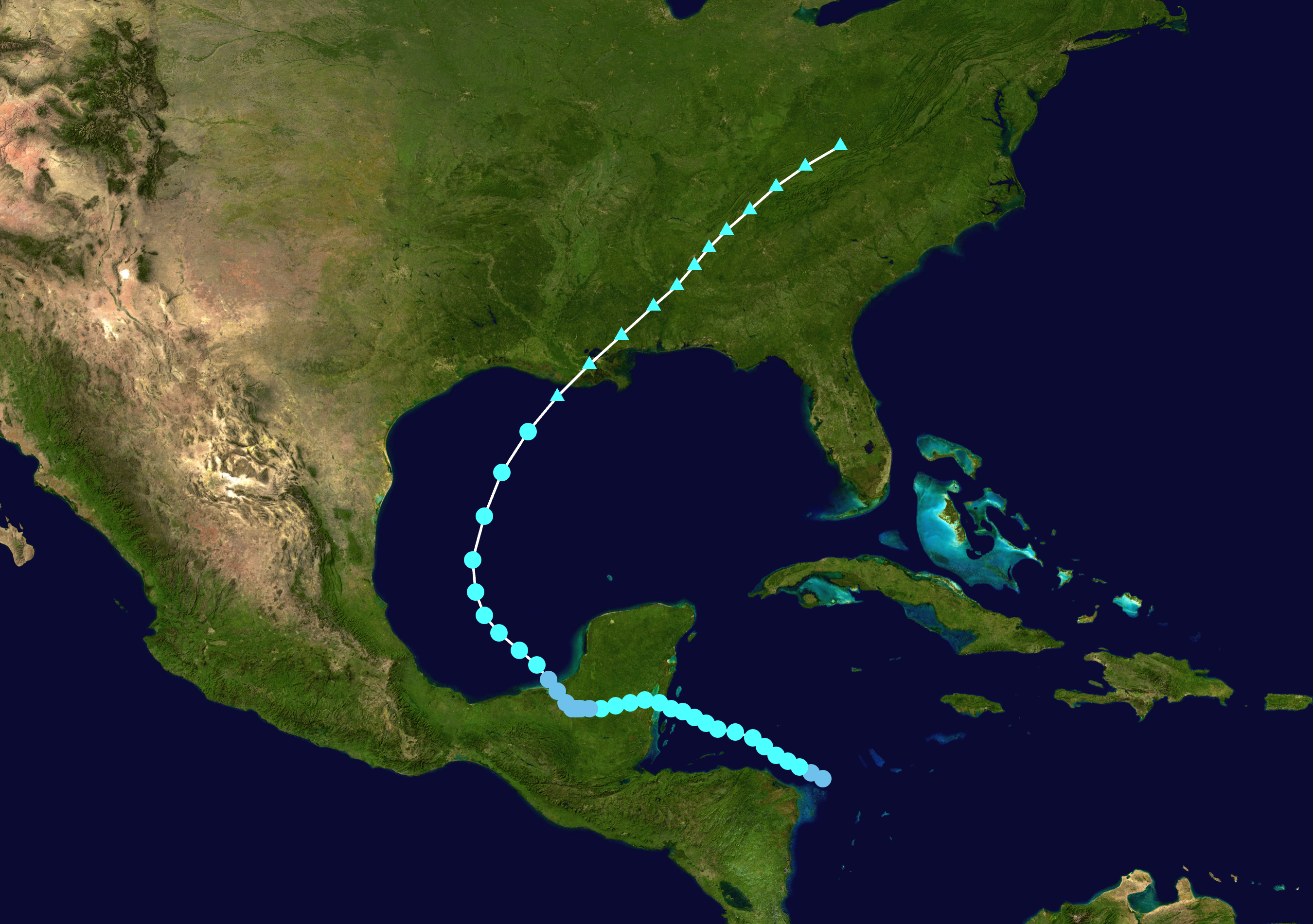
- Duration: October 7 – October 15
- Peak intensity: 70 mph (110 km/h) (1-min); 990 mbar (hPa)

A tropical depression formed on October 7 from a broad low-pressure area in the central Caribbean offshore Honduras. Moving slowly to the west-northwest, the depression steadily intensified, reaching tropical storm strength at 12:00 UTC the same day. The storm continued to intensify as it moved towards the Yucatán Peninsula, reaching peak intensity late on October 9, with maximum sustained wind speeds of 70 mph (110 km/h). The storm made landfall near Playa del Carmen at 04:00 UTC the next day, while still at peak intensity. Over land, the storm weakened to a tropical depression on October 11 as it curved northwestward. On the next day, the depression later emerged into the Gulf of Mexico, where it began to restrengthen. By 12:00 UTC on October 13, the elongated system regained tropical storm strength, before reaching a secondary peak intensity of 60 mph (97 km/h). However, baroclinic forces caused the storm to become extratropical prior to striking Louisiana on October 15. The extratropical remnants of the storm continued to trek to the northeast, before it merged with another extratropical system over West Virginia.

In Mexico, the storm produced tropical storm-force winds, with a sustained wind speed of 52 mph (84 km/h) in the city of Veracruz. As the system approached the Gulf Coast of the United States, storm warnings were issued from Brownsville, Texas, to Apalachicola, Florida. Its extratropical remnants brought gale–force winds to portions of Louisiana. Offshore, a cargo ship carrying asphalt sunk due to strong waves, causing $30,000 in losses. In addition heavy rains caused rivers to exceed flood stage, particularly east of where the storm made landfall, isolating homes and interrupting traffic. The Black Warrior River exceeded its flood stage by 14 ft (4.3 m), and the Catawba River also overflowed. A peak rainfall of 8.5 in (220 mm) was reported during a 17‑hour period in Tuscaloosa, Alabama. The storm also brought widespread rainfall across the South Atlantic states through orographic lift, peaking at 9.3 in (240 mm) in Rock House, North Carolina. Washout from the rains also caused a train wreck.

=== Tropical Storm Twelve ===
- Tropical storm (SSHWS)
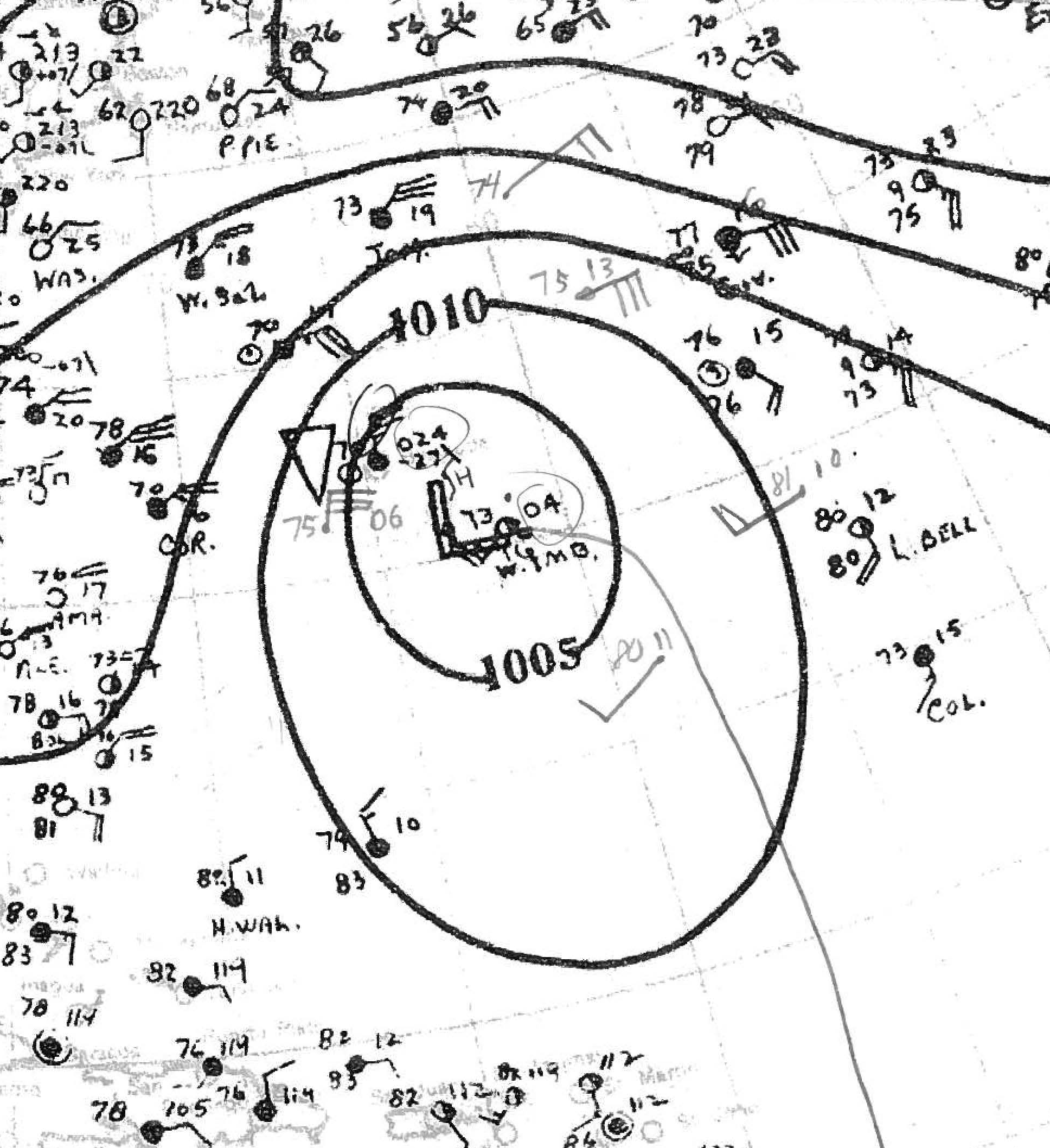
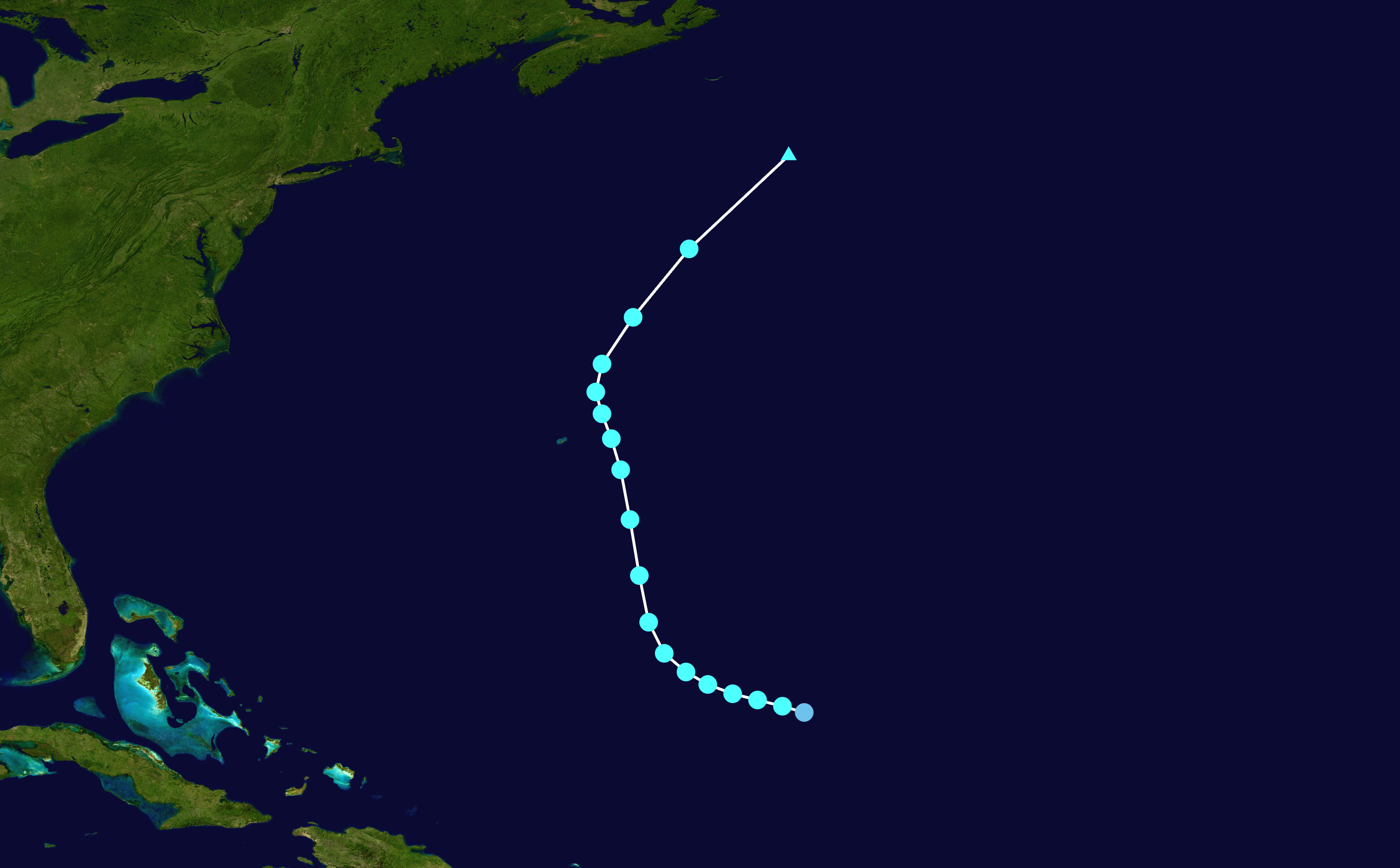
- Duration: October 8 – October 12
- Peak intensity: 60 mph (95 km/h) (1-min); 997 mbar (hPa)

A tropical depression was first identified on October 8 about 575 mi (925 km) northeast of the Virgin Islands and quickly intensified to a tropical storm. Moving towards the west and then northwest, the storm intensified to its peak intensity of 60 mph (97 km/h) at 1800 UTC on October 10 as it neared Bermuda. The island reported sustained wind speeds up to 40 mph (64 km/h). The storm weakened as it progressed farther northward and curved toward the northeast, before transitioning into an extratropical cyclone by 0600 UTC on October 12 approximately 205 mi (330 km) southeast of Sable Island. The system was absorbed by a strong cold frontal boundary later that day.

=== Tropical Storm Thirteen ===
- Tropical storm (SSHWS)
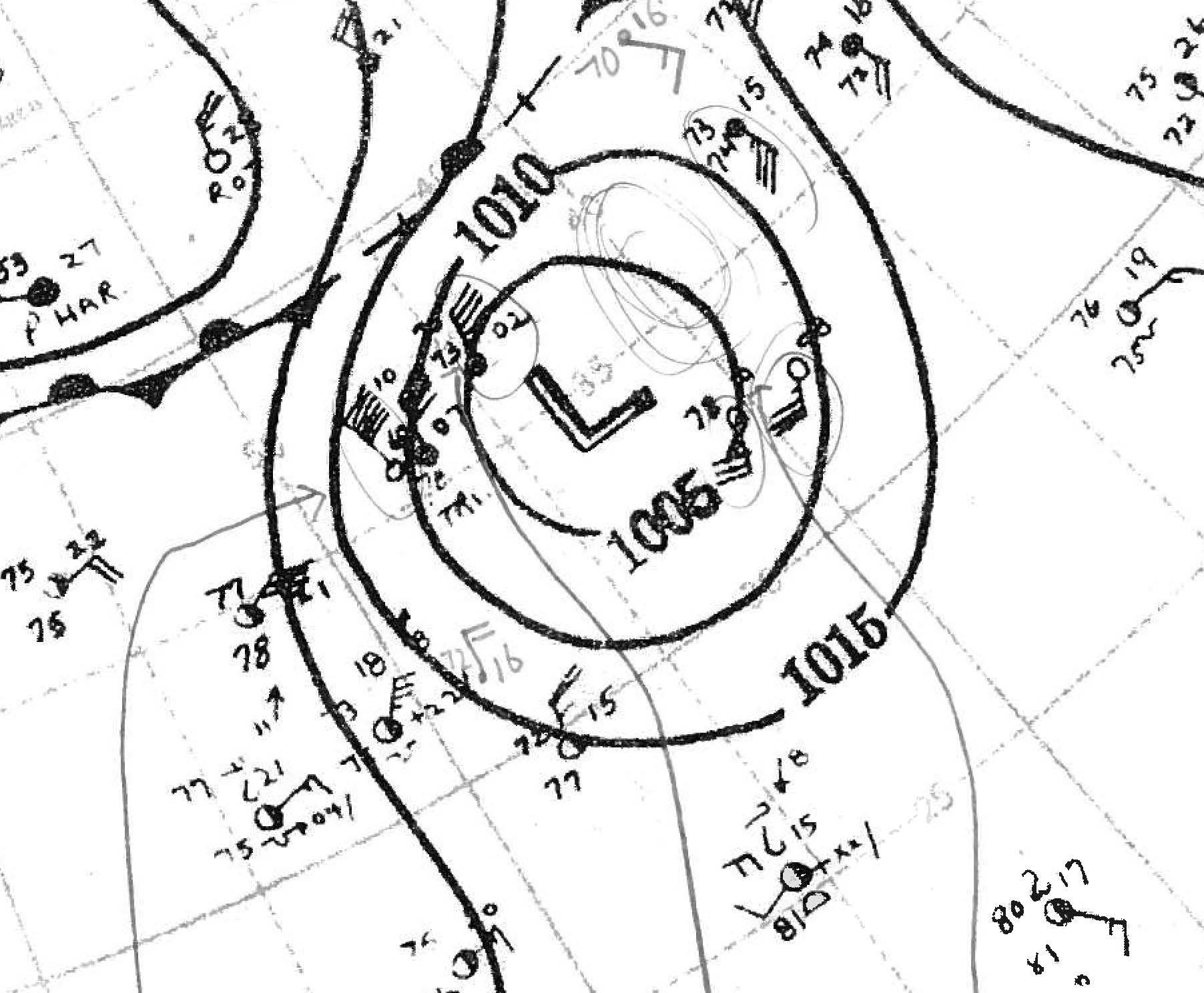
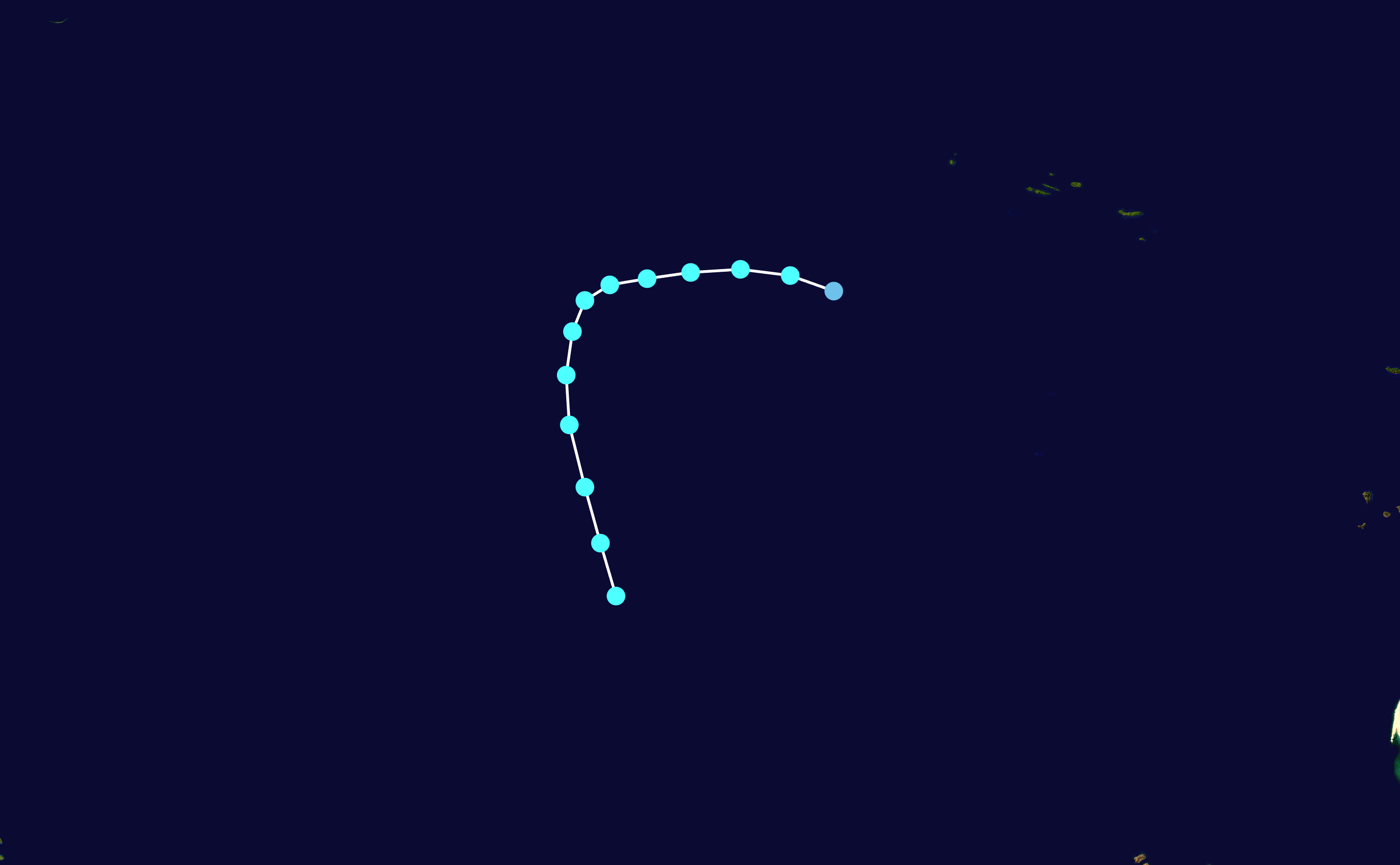
- Duration: October 18 – October 21
- Peak intensity: 70 mph (110 km/h) (1-min); 999 mbar (hPa)

On October 17, a stationary front positioned over the eastern Atlantic began to dissipate, and a large area of low pressure began to form along the front boundary. The disturbance intensified to tropical storm strength at 0000 UTC on October 18 about 1,220 mi (1,965 km) northwest of the westernmost islands of Cabo Verde, after losing baroclinity. As it moved towards the north, the system slowly intensified to an estimated peak intensity of 70 mph (110 km/h) at 0600 UTC on October 19, as suggested by a nearby ship that also reported 70 mph (110 km/h) winds. At the same time, the storm also turned eastward, and subsequently began to weaken. The system degenerated to tropical depression strength on October 21, and dissipated shortly thereafter around 415 mi (670 km) southwest of the central Azores.

=== Hurricane Fourteen ===
- Category 5 hurricane (SSHWS)
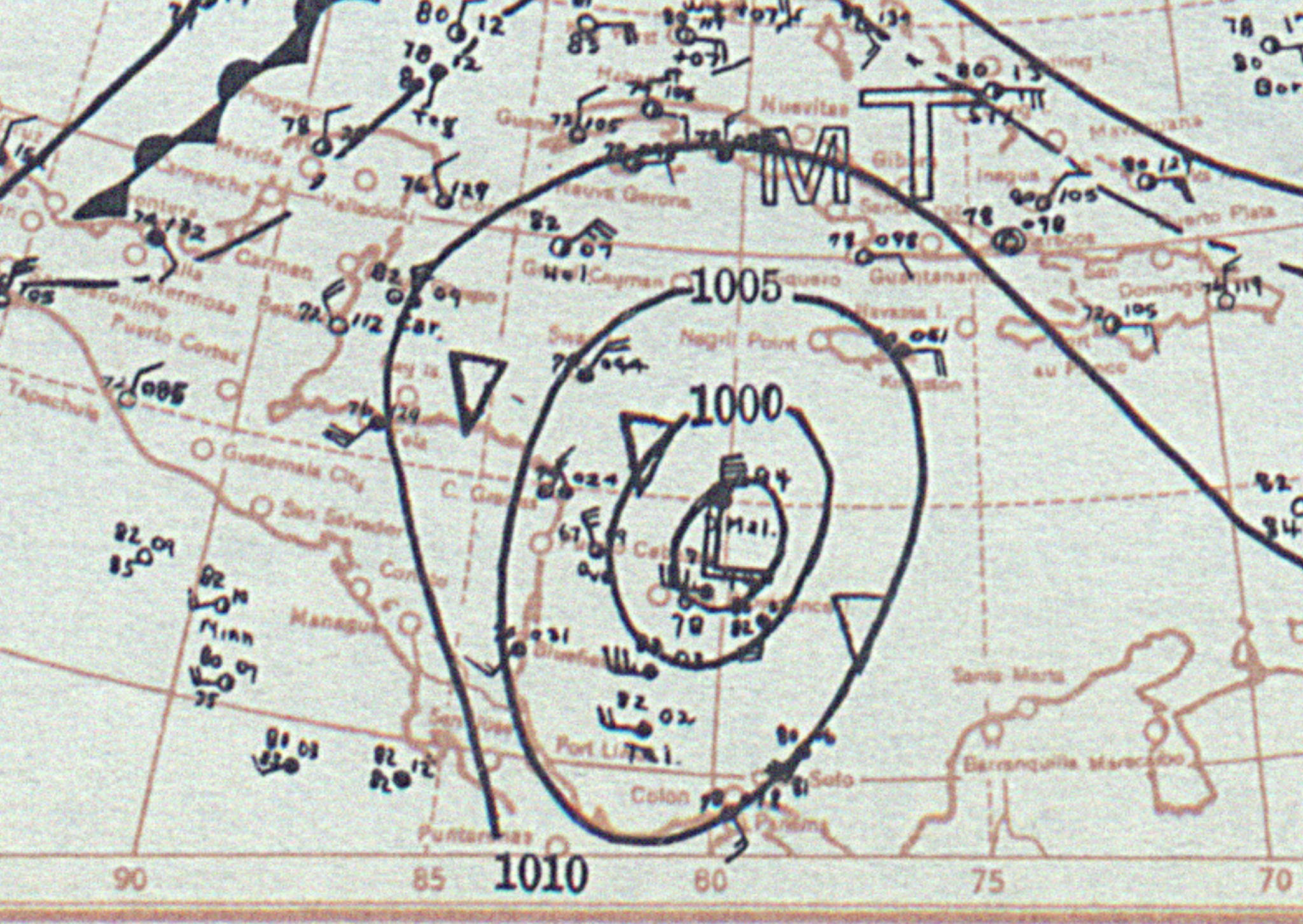
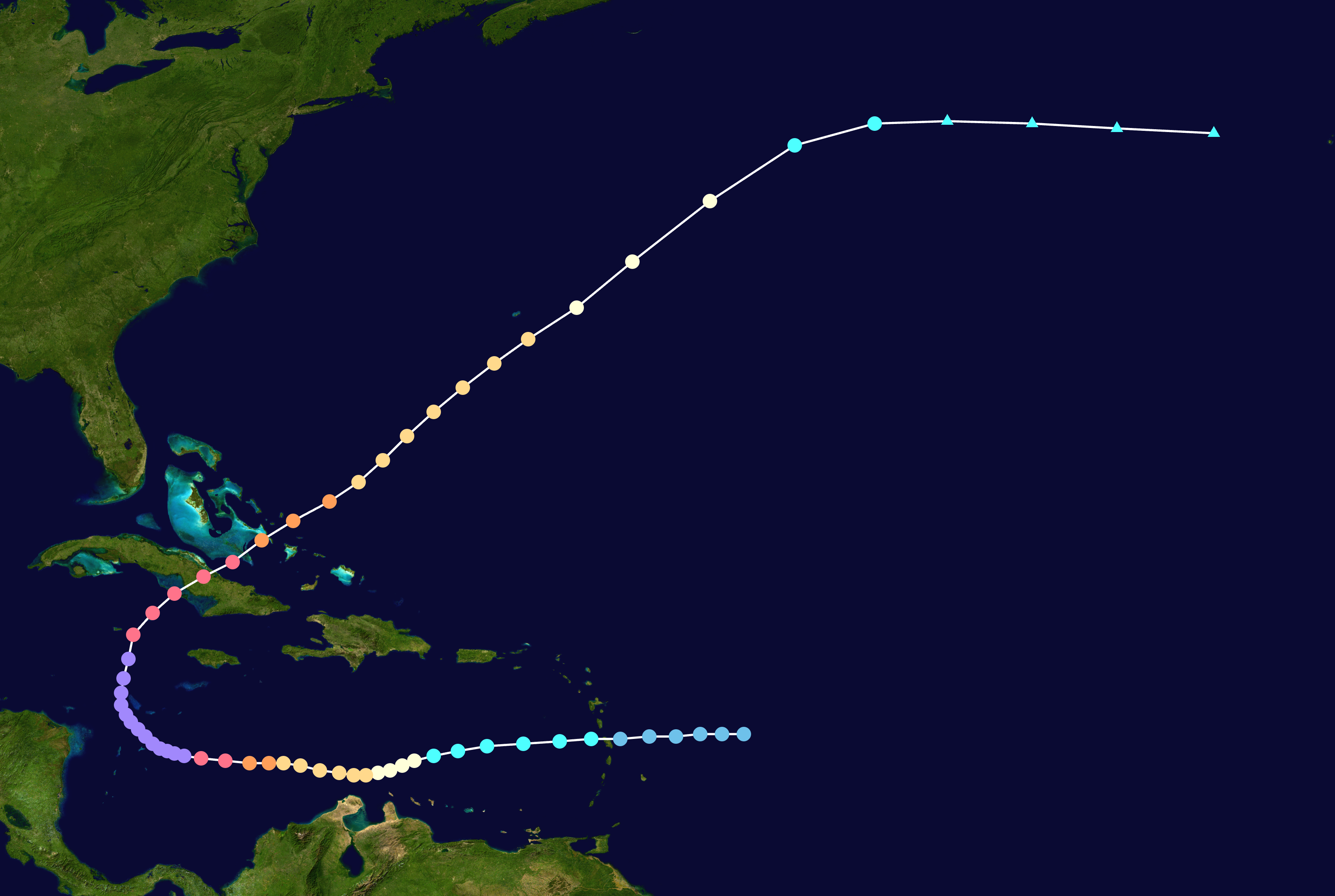
- Duration: October 30 – November 13
- Peak intensity: 175 mph (280 km/h) (1-min); ≤915 mbar (hPa)

Early on October 30, a tropical depression formed about 300 mi (485 km) northeast of Barbados. Moving nearly due west, the depression brushed Martinique on October 31, shortly before entering the Caribbean and intensifying into a tropical storm. Upon reaching the central Caribbean, the cyclone turned west-southwestward and strengthened into a hurricane early on November 2. It reached Category 2 status about 24 hours later near the Guajira Peninsula. The storm strengthened into a major hurricane on November 4, and continued to intensify, peaking as a Category 5 hurricane with maximum sustained winds of 175 mph (282 km/h) and a minimum barometric pressure at or below 915 mb (27.02 inHg) on November 5 as it moved west-northwestward over the western Caribbean. The storm later turned northward and then northeastward by early November 9, around the time that it weakened to a Category 4 hurricane. Overall, the system maintained Category 5 status for 78 hours, which is the longest amount of time on record for a storm to remain at that intensity. The cyclone struck Camagüey Province in Cuba on November 9 as a Category 4 hurricane with winds of 150 mph (240 km/h) and a barometric pressure of 918 mb (27.11 inHg). The storm emerged into the Atlantic over the Bahamas and continued to slowly weaken. On November 13, the cyclone fell to tropical storm intensity and became extratropical several hours later about 530 mi (855 km) southeast of Cape Race, Newfoundland. The extratropical low turned eastward and dissipated near the Azores late on the following day.

In the ABC islands, the hurricane destroyed Curaçao's harbor fortifications, while the pier on Bonaire was demolished. Several coastal towns and seaports in Colombia in the vicinities of Barranquilla and Santa Marta suffered extensive damage. Some inland farms were ruined by flooding and strong winds. On Providencia Island, major damage to agriculture occurred and 36 homes were demolished. High winds in Jamaica downed more than 2 million trees and caused up to a 50 percent loss of banana crops in some areas. Damage in Jamaica totaled approximately $4 million. In the Cayman Islands, the storm was considered the worst to strike the archipelago until Hurricane Ivan in 2004. On Grand Cayman, 60 homes were either destroyed or suffered major damage, rendering about 250 people homeless, while only 6 dwellings remained standing on Little Cayman. The hurricane demolished schools on both Cayman Brac and Grand Cayman. The death toll in the Cayman Islands reached at least 109. In Cuba, a massive storm surge measuring 21 ft (6.5 m) in height inundated Santa Cruz del Sur in Camagüey Province. Out of the approximately 4,800 residents, an estimated 2,870 people in Santa Cruz del Sur were killed and less than 10 percent of the town's population was uninjured. Few homes in the town remained standing following the storm. Many other communities in the province suffered devastation. A Pan Am radio operator in Nuevitas reported that nearly all frame-buildings in the area were destroyed and most public buildings sustained serious damage. The hurricane also caused impacts in Oriente and Santa Clara provinces. Overall, damage in Cuba totaled approximately $40 million, while at least 3,033 fatalities occurred, making the storm the deadliest in the nation's history. The cyclone also caused significant impacts in the central Bahamas, especially on Cat Island, Exuma, Long Island, and Rum Cay, damaging or destroying many crops, structures, and vessels. Two deaths occurred in the Bahamas. Wind gusts on Bermuda reached 87 mph (140 km/h) at St. George's, downing some electrical and telephone wires and tree branches.

=== Hurricane Fifteen ===
- Category 2 hurricane (SSHWS)
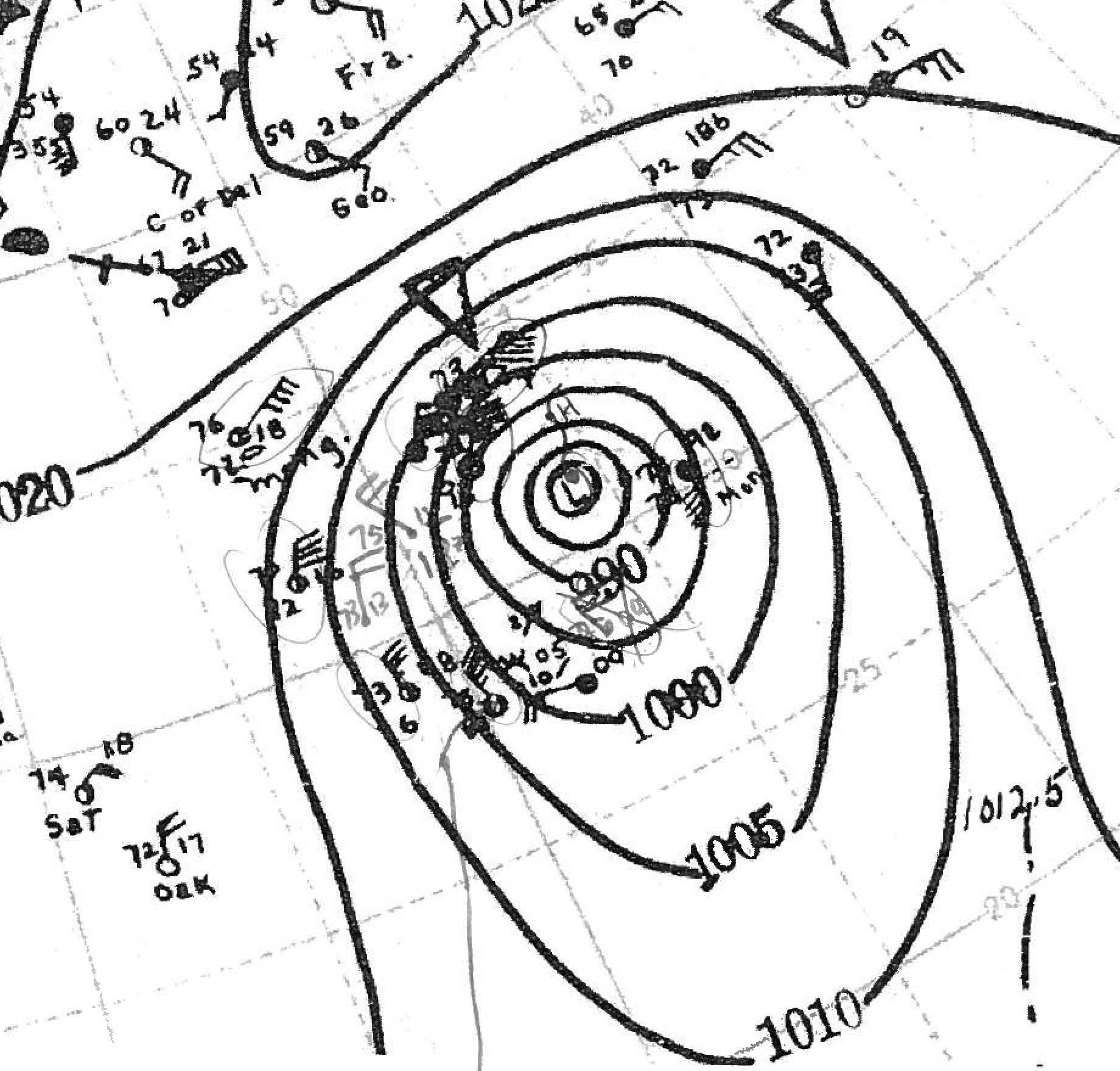
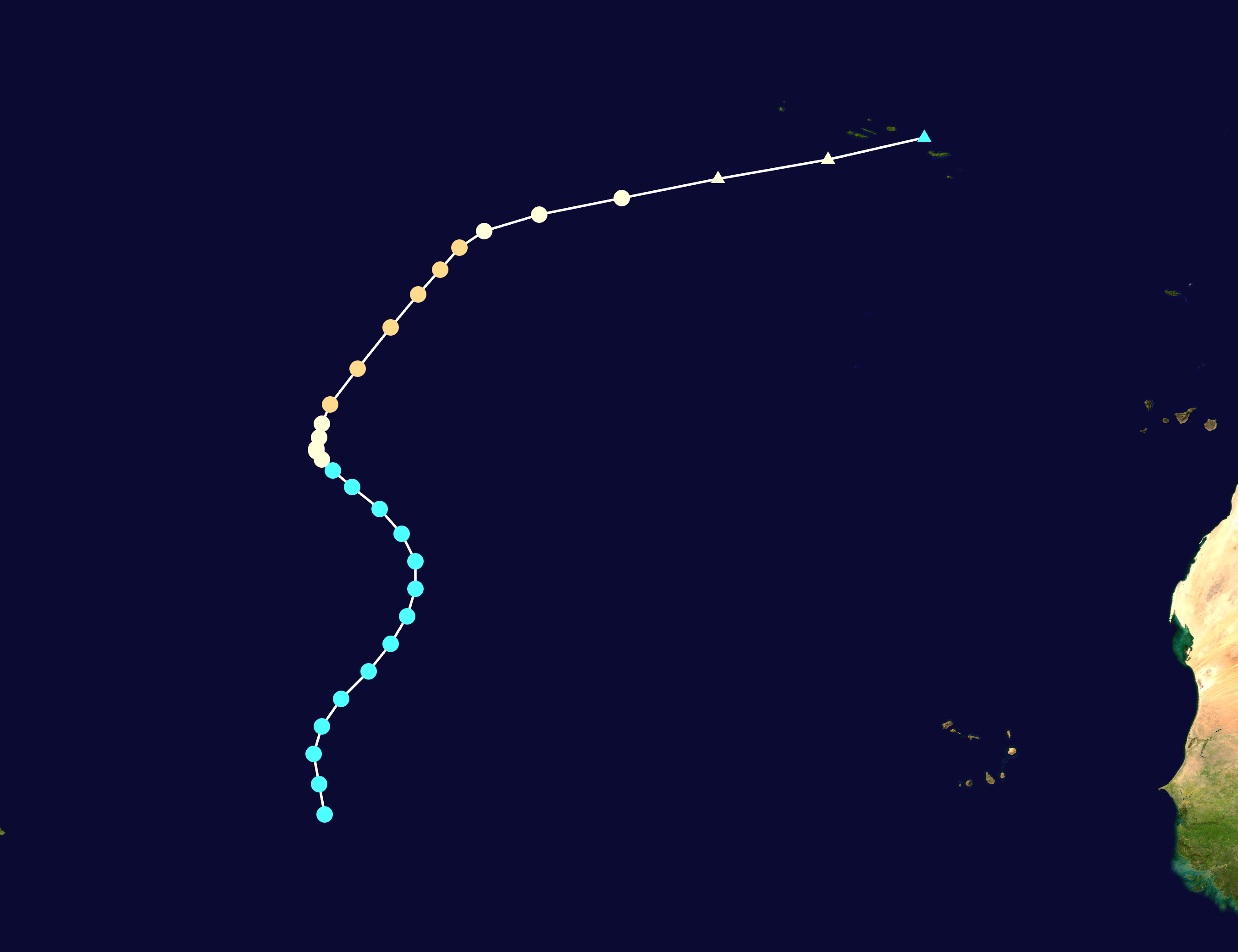
- Duration: November 3 – November 10
- Peak intensity: 100 mph (155 km/h) (1-min); 973 mbar (hPa)

A tropical storm was first identified in the Central Atlantic about 785 mi (1,265 km) east of Barbados at 0600 UTC on November 3, with ships reporting moderate gales in its vicinity. Throughout its existence, the storm moved in an erratic path, generally to the north. Steadily intensifying, the storm became a hurricane at 1800 UTC on November 6, as it began to move towards the northeast towards the Azores. The hurricane continued to intensify, attaining Category 2 intensity early on November 8 and at the same time reaching its peak intensity with maximum sustained winds of 100 mph (160 km/h). After reaching peak intensity, a weakening trend began as the storm accelerated east-northeastward. Early on November 10, the system transitioned into an extratropical cyclone about 210 mi (340 km) southwest of the northwesternmost islands of the Azores, while still maintaining hurricane-force winds. The extratropical system continued to quickly move east-northeastward until it coalesced with another extratropical cyclone on November 11.

== Season effects ==
The following table lists all of the storms that formed in the 1932 Atlantic hurricane season. It includes their duration, names, areas affected, damages, and death totals. Deaths in parentheses are indirect (an example of an indirect death would be a traffic accident), but were still related to that storm. Damage and deaths include totals from the storm's precursor and its remnants, and all of the damage figures are in 1932 USD.

Saffir–Simpson scale
TD	TS	C1	C2	C3	C4	C5

1932 North Atlantic tropical cyclone season statistics
Storm name	Dates active	Storm category at peak intensity	Max 1-min wind mph (km/h)	Min. press. (mbar)	Areas affected	Damage (US$)	Deaths	Ref(s).
One	May 5–10	Tropical storm	65 (100)	995	Hispaniola	None	None	
Two	August 12–15	Category 4 hurricane	150 (240)	935	Texas	$7.5 million	40	
Three	August 26 – September 2	Category 1 hurricane	85 (140)	979	Turks and Caicos Islands, the Bahamas, Southeastern United States (Florida and Alabama), Midwest United States, Ontario, Quebec	$229,000	(1)	
Four	August 30 – September 9	Category 5 hurricane	160 (260)	≤931	The Bahamas, Southeastern United States, East Coast of the United States, Newfoundland, Greenland, Iceland, Jan Mayen Island, Scandinavia, Soviet Union	Unknown	16	
Five	September 4–7	Tropical storm	70 (110)	992	None	None	None	
Six	September 9–15	Tropical storm	60 (95)	999	Gulf Coast of the United States, East Coast of the United States, Atlantic Canada	$10,000	None	
Seven	September 16–22	Tropical storm	65 (100)	994	Atlantic Canada	Unknown	None	
Eight	September 18–20	Tropical storm	65 (100)	998	West South Central United States (Louisiana), Ohio River Valley	Unknown	None	
Nine	September 25 – October 2	Category 4 hurricane	145 (230)	943	Leeward Islands (Virgin Islands), Greater Antilles (Puerto Rico, Hispaniola, Jamaica), Belize, Mexico	$35.8 million	272	
Ten	September 28–30	Tropical storm	45 (75)	1004	None	None	None	
Eleven	October 7–15	Tropical storm	70 (110)	990	Belize, Mexico, Southeastern United States, Ohio River Valley	$30,000	None	
Twelve	October 8–12	Tropical storm	60 (95)	997	Bermuda	Unknown	None	
Thirteen	October 18–21	Tropical storm	70 (110)	999	None	None	None	
Fourteen	October 30 – November 13	Category 5 hurricane	175 (280)	≤915	Leeward Islands, Venezuela, Colombia, Jamaica, Cayman Islands, Cuba, the Bahamas, Bermuda	$44 million	>3,144	
Fifteen	November 3–10	Category 2 hurricane	100 (155)	973	Azores	Unknown	None	
Season aggregates
15 systems	May 5 – November 13		175 (280)	≤915		$87.569 million	>3,472 (1)	

== See also ==
- Atlantic hurricane season
