= Crown Haven =

Town on Abaco, Bahamas

- Location within Bahamas
- Coordinates: 26°54′N 77°49′W
- Country: Bahamas
- Island: Abaco
- District: North Abaco

Population (2010)
  - Total: 210
- Time zone: UTC-5 (Eastern Time Zone)
- Area code: 242

Crown Haven is a medium-sized community on the island of Abaco in northern Bahamas. It can be found in the most northwestern part of the island within the North Abaco district.

The population of Crown Haven is 210 (from the 2010 census).
