= North Abaco =

District of The Bahamas

District of North Abaco North Abaco
- Motto: "No Excuses, No Limits"
- Location of the District of North Abaco
- Coordinates: 26°47′N 77°26′W
- Country: Bahamas
- Island: Abaco
- Established: 1996

Government
  - Type: District Council

Area
  - Total: 207 km^{2} (80 sq mi)

Population (2010)
  - Total: 9,578
  - Density: 46/km^{2} (120/sq mi)
- Time zone: UTC−5 (EST)
  - Summer (DST): UTC−4 (EDT)
- Area code: 242

North Abaco is one of the districts of the Bahamas, on the Abaco Islands. It has a population of 9,578 according to the 2010 census.

Some of the more well-known settlements within this district include:

- Wood Cay
- Crown Haven
- Cedar Harbour
- Coopers Town
- Fire Road Village
- Black Wood Village
- New Plymouth
- Treasure Cay
- Murphy Town
- Dundas Town

== Transportation ==
The area is served by Treasure Cay Airport.

== Politics ==
For elections to the Parliament of the Bahamas, the district is represented by the North Abaco constituency.
