= Coopers Town =

Town in Abaco, Bahamas

- Village
- Location in The Bahamas
- Coordinates: 26°52′07″N 77°30′29″W
- Country: Bahamas
- Island: Abaco
- District: North Abaco
- Elevation: 0 m (0 ft)

Population (2010)
  - Total: 676
- Time zone: UTC-05:00 (EST)
  - Summer (DST): UTC-04:00 (EDT)
- Area code: 242

Coopers Town is a village in Abaco, the second largest island of the Bahamas. It has a population of 676, per the 2010 census.

The town is the northernmost of the island's main centres of population. It was settled in the 1870s by the Albert Bootle family from Grand Bahama. Early industry included pineapple and sea-sponge harvesting, but both industries have dwindled over the last century. A major impediment to the success of these industries was the lack of a natural harbour at Coopers Town.

Prominent residents of Coopers Town have included the previous Bahamian Prime Minister Hubert Ingraham, and sprinter Shavez Hart.
