= Andros Conservancy & Trust Bahamas =

Andros Conservancy & Trust Bahamas (ANCAT) is an environmental nonprofit non-governmental organisation (NGO) dedicated to preserving the natural resources of Andros Island, the Bahamas. Founded in 1999, among its key accomplishment was the 2002 formation of the 286,000 acre Central Andros National Park, in co-operation with the Bahamas National Trust, a division of the Bahamian government.

According to its Mission Statement, ANCAT's purpose is to "To protect, preserve, enhance, and restore the natural resources of Andros Island and its marine environment through education, conservation and management for future generations."

Andros Island is home to the world's largest collection of blue holes, and the world's third largest barrier reef, as well as extensive internationally endangered habitats. It is approximately the size of Puerto Rico, but has only approximately 8,000 residents. Its vast expanses of undeveloped land and low population density (1.31/km^{2}), together with Andros' unique combination of undisturbed environmental features, presents a rare opportunity for environmental preservation. Globally-imperiled pine rocklands are prime habitat for migratory songbirds such as the Kirtland's warbler, one of North America's rarest birds. These forests are abutted by Hardwood forests and expanses of freshwater marshes. Other fauna found on the island include giant land crabs, the Bahama woodstar hummingbird, the West Indian whistling duck and the Northern Bahamian rock iguana, listed as threatened with extinction. Palm savannas contain mahogany, Bahamian pine, palmetto, maidenhair ferns and several endemic orchids. Beautiful yellow and red blossoms adorn the island's blue mahoe, an endemic hibiscus.

ANCAT is one of only two NGOs in the Bahamas recognised by the United Nations Social and Economic Council which supervises NGOs internationally. ANCAT is completely funded by grants and donations. Among its partners are the Nature Conservancy, and the Professional Association of Diver Instructors' (PADI) Project AWARE.

ANCAT is involved with the expansion of the Andros West Side National Park, and a restoration project of Fresh Creek, the Bahamas' only freshwater river.
