= Abaco Islands =

Group of islands in the Bahamas

Abaco
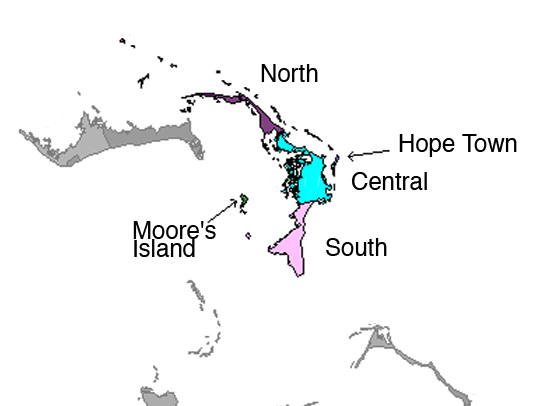
- The five administrative districts of the Abaco

- Location within Bahamas Location within North Atlantic

Geography
- Location: Atlantic Ocean
- Coordinates: 26°28′N 77°05′W
- Archipelago: Bahamas
- Major islands: Great Abaco Island, Little Abaco Island
- Area: 2,009 km^{2} (776 sq mi)

Administration
- Bahamas
- Island: Abaco
- Largest settlement: Marsh Harbour (pop. 5,314)

Demographics
- Population: 16,587 (2022)
- Pop. density: 8.6/km^{2} (22.3/sq mi)

The Abaco Islands lie in the north of The Bahamas, about 193 miles (167.7 nautical miles or 310.6 km) east of Miami, Florida, United States. The main islands are Great Abaco and Little Abaco, which is just west of Great Abaco's northern tip.

There are several smaller barrier cays, of which the northernmost are Walker's Cay and its sister island Grand Cay. To the south, the next inhabited islands are Spanish Cay and Green Turtle Cay, with its settlement of New Plymouth, Great Guana Cay, private Scotland Cay, Man-O-War Cay and Elbow Cay, with its settlement of Hope Town. Southernmost are Tilloo Cay and Lubbers Quarters. Also off Abaco's western shore is Gorda Cay, a Disney-owned island and cruise ship stop renamed Castaway Cay. Also in the vicinity is Moore's Island.

On the Big Island of Abaco is Marsh Harbour, the Abacos' commercial hub and The Bahamas' third-largest city, plus the resort area of Treasure Cay. Both have airports. Mainland settlements include Coopers Town and Fox Town in the north and Cherokee and Sandy Point in the south.

Administratively, the Abaco Islands constitute seven of the 31 Local Government Districts of The Bahamas: Grand Cay, North Abaco, Green Turtle Cay, Central Abaco, South Abaco, Moore's Island and Hope Town.

== Geography ==
The Abaco Islands consist of limestone, with some elevation, and are protected on the Atlantic-facing sides by the third-largest barrier reef in the world. The cays are primarily made up of tidal mangrove swamps, as well as white-sand beaches. Most of the islands are uninhabited. The Abaco Islands and their associated cays are the Out Islands, Family Islands, and Friendly Islands.

== History ==
The Abaco Islands were first inhabited by the Lucayans, who called the Abaco Islands Lucayoneque, meaning "the people's distant waters". The first European settlers of the islands were Loyalists fleeing the American War of Independence who arrived in 1783, as was also the Cat Island case. These original Loyalist settlers made a modest living by salvaging wrecks, by building small wooden boats, and basic farming.

=== Pre-Columbian and Spanish eras ===
The Lucayans were the first people to inhabit the Abaco Islands. They were a branch of the Taínos who inhabited most of the Caribbean islands at the time. The Lucayans were the first inhabitants of the Americas encountered by Christopher Columbus. The Spanish started seizing Lucayans as slaves within a few years of Columbus's arrival, and they had all been removed from the Bahamas by 1520. After the extermination of the Lucayans, there were no known permanent settlements in the Bahamas for approximately 130 years.

Spain laid claim to the Bahamas after Columbus discovered the islands but showed little interest in them. The Italian explorer Amerigo Vespucci spent four months exploring the Bahamas in 1499–1500. Juan de la Cosa's first map of the New World, printed in 1500, shows the Abaco Islands with the name Habacoa. The Peter Martyr map, in the first edition of De Orbe Novo in 1511, shows the Bahamas' islands but does not name them. The Spanish explorer Juan Ponce de León landed on Abaco in 1513. The Turin map of 1523 clearly shows Abaco, then named Iucayonique. The Turin map remained the most accurate map of the area until the Bahamas' first English maps were produced. Both John White's map of 1590 and Thomas Hood's map of 1592 show the islands, as did a map produced in 1630 by the Dutchman de Laet. At this time, the Spanish empire in the Caribbean was focused on Havana. Spain regarded the depopulated Bahamas as unprofitable and treacherous to navigate;- in 1593, a Spanish fleet of 17 ships wrecked off the Abaco. Also, English and French pirates and freebooters had begun preying on Spanish vessels north of Cuba. A Spanish ordinance of 1561 forbade any merchant ship to enter the Bahamas without an escort. Ownership of the Bahamas passed back and forth between Spain and Great Britain for 150 years. A treaty was established in 1783 by Great Britain. Great Britain ceded East Florida to Spain, receiving the Bahamas in return.

=== British colonial era ===
In 1783, a call for those wishing to help settle Abaco was published in the Royal Gazette in New York City. About 1,500 Loyalists left New York and moved to Abaco in August 1783. The Loyalists settled on a small sandy harbor about six leagues north of Marsh Harbour near modern-day Treasure Cay. They planned and built the town of Carleton, named after Sir Guy Carleton. Disputes over food distribution and misinformation about the resources available led some of these settlers to found a rival town near Marsh Harbour called Maxwell. The conflict between disgruntled settlers and the officials responsible became a constant life feature on the islands. Sea island cotton was sown by the settlers in 1785, and although both 1786 and 1787 produced good crops, the 1788 crop was blighted by caterpillars. Other settlements on the islands were Green Turtle Cay, Man-o-War Cay, and Sandy Point. In the 1790s, a group of Loyalists from the Carolinas arrived on the islands via Florida, founding the isolated settlement of Cherokee Sound.

=== Slave Revolt ===
Two slave ships from the United States, the Encomium and the Comet, wrecked off the coast of Abaco in December 1830 and 1834 respectively. The customs officers of Nassau seized the 165 slaves from the Comet and the 48 slaves from the Encomium, freeing them despite the protests of the crew. A later indemnity passed hands between the governments of the United Kingdom and the United States in 1855.

The Hermosa, another slave ship, wrecked in Abaco in 1840. The slaves aboard were unilaterally emancipated by the Bahamians involved. These situations influenced the later revolt led by Madison Washington.

=== Bahamian Independence ===
In June 1971, the Prime Minister of The Bahamas, Lynden Pindling, announced his government's independence from Britain. On Abaco, the Greater Abaco Council formed to lobby for continued British rule. In July 1971, the Greater Abaco Council submitted a petition to the Queen asking that Abaco become a 'completely self-contained and fully self-supporting' territory under British jurisdiction. In August 1971, the British government refused to consider the petition. The September 1972 general election in The Bahamas showed a clear majority for independence across the country.

However, on Abaco, the results were less clear-cut; the pro-independence Progressive Liberal Party won one of Abaco's two seats by a small majority and, by comparison, the Free National Movement (which opposed early independence) won the other chair by a large majority. Starting in December 1971, all-party talks took place in London, to draft a new constitution for The Bahamas. The Greater Abaco Council sent their representatives to London for a 'collateral conference' to run alongside the official talks. The British refused to consider granting Abaco independence (secession) from the rest of The Bahamas. The GAC accepted this, and the group ceased activity at the end of 1972.

Shortly afterward, Errington Watkins, the Free National Movement representative for the Abaco-Marsh Harbour seat, formed a successor group called the Council for a Free Abaco. A second petition was organized and signed by half of the registered voters on the island. Errington Watkins took this petition to London in May 1973, hoping to influence The Bahamas Independence Order, then-debated in the British Parliament. A sympathetic MP, Ronald Bell, introduced an amendment that would have excluded Abaco from an independent Bahamas and have the islands remain a British colony. Defeated in the House of Commons and The Bahamas Independence Order, this amendment was approved on 22 May 1973. Three weeks later, a similar motion on Abaco was defeated in the House of Lords.

A last-ditch attempt by Errington Watkins to pass a resolution in The Bahamas House of Assembly calling for a United Nations-supervised referendum on Abaco was easily defeated in June 1973, and The Bahamas became independent on 10 July 1973.

=== Abaco Independence Movement and onward ===
In August 1973, shortly after The Bahamas became independent, the Abaco Independence Movement was formed as a political party whose stated aim was self-determination for Abaco within a federal Bahamas. Chuck Hall and Bert Williams created AIM. They sought support from the US Libertarian Party and an American financier named Michael Oliver, who through his libertarian Phoenix Foundation agreed to support AIM financially. Mitchell WerBell, an American arms dealer and mercenary, also supported AIM. His talk of an armed insurrection and attempts to recruit mercenaries to go to Abaco greatly discredited AIM. The Progressive Liberal Party victory in the 1977 general election effectively marked the end of the movement.

=== Hurricane Dorian ===
On 1 September 2019, Hurricane Dorian made landfall on Elbow Cay in the Abaco Islands at 16:40 UTC with winds of 185 mph (300 km/h) and wind gusts up to 225 mph (360 km/h), tying Dorian with the 1935 Labor Day hurricane as the strongest landfalling Atlantic hurricane on record. Reports of major damage throughout the islands were described as "catastrophic damage" and "pure hell".

75 percent of the island's homes were damaged or destroyed. The total cost of Hurricane Dorian's impacts and effects on The Bahamas was $3.4 billion. As of October 18, 2019, there were 67 confirmed deaths as a result of Hurricane Dorian, with 282 people still missing. The damage also impacted the homes and assets of another 29,472 people. Hurricane Dorian wreaked havoc on Grand Bahama and Abaco, with damaging winds and storm surges, as well as the island of New Providence. The $3.4 billion in damages, losses, and additional costs were split as follows: 72 percent damage, 21 percent losses, and 7% additional costs, with the private sector absorbing nearly 90 percent of total losses. Abaco was responsible for 87% of the losses and 76% of the damage.

== Demographics ==
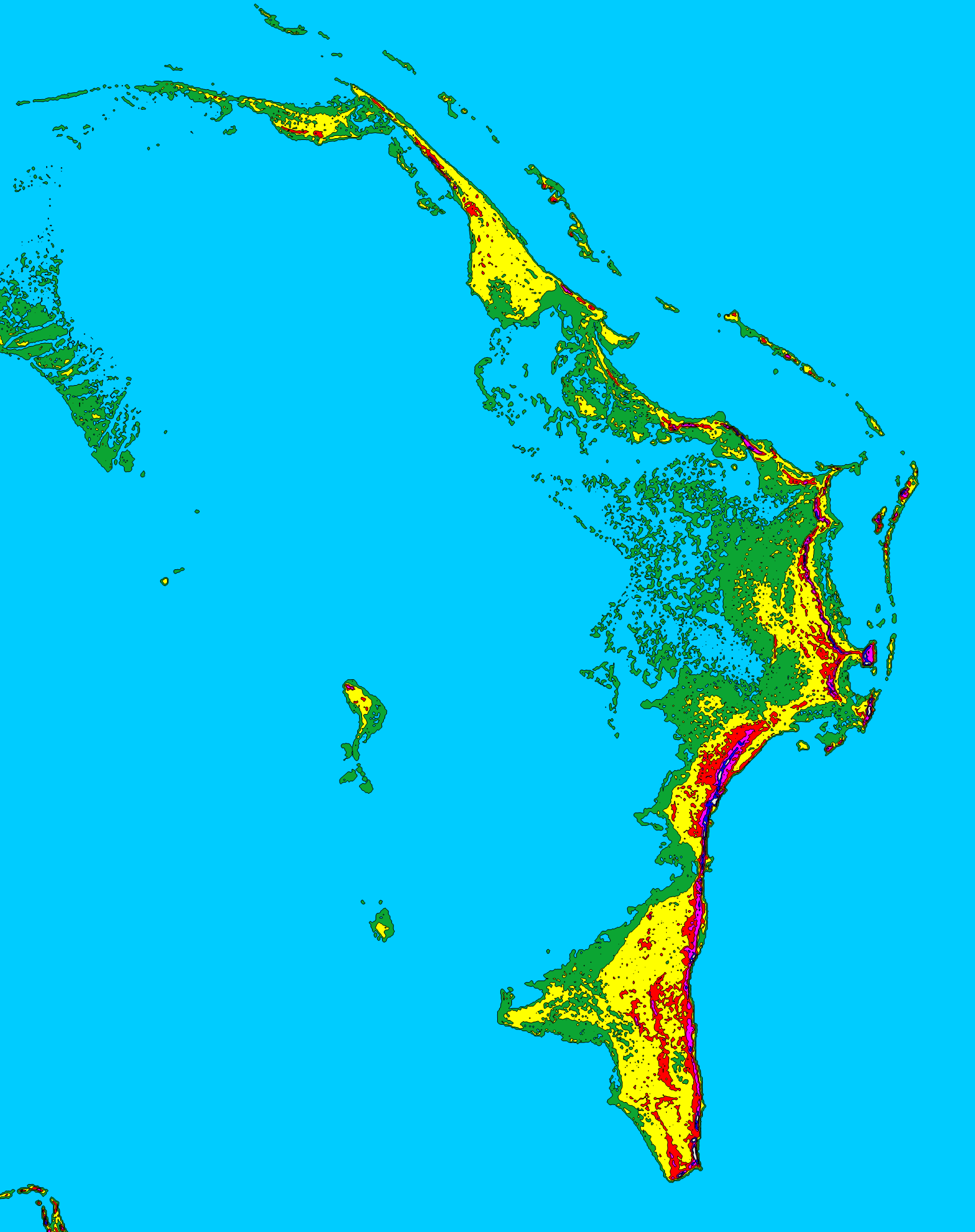
Topographic map of the Abaco Islands

The combined population of the islands was about 17,224 as of 2010, and the principal settlement and capital is Marsh Harbour.

In addition to Marsh Harbour there are several other settlements on Great Abaco including Cherokee Sound, Coopers Town, Crossing Rock, Green Turtle Cay, Hope Town, Little Harbour, Rocky Point, Sandy Point, Spring City, Treasure Cay, Wilson City, and Winding Bay.

Surrounding Great Abaco are several smaller islands known as cays, many of which are popular with tourists visiting the islands. A few notable cays include Castaway Cay (formerly Gorda Cay), Elbow Cay, the Grand Cays, Great Guana Cay, Green Turtle Cay, Man-O-War Cay, Moore's Island, Tilloo Cay, and Walker's Cay.

Race (2010 census)	Number	Percentage
Black	14,080	81.75%
White	2,370	13.76%
Black and White	384	2.23%
Black and Other	97	0.56%
White and Other	90	0.52%
East Indian	25	0.15%
Asian	24	0.14%
Other races	60	0.35%

== Activities ==
The Bahamas National Trust maintains six national parks in the Abacos Islands. These are:

- Pelican Cays Land and Sea Park
- Abaco National Park
- Black Sound Cay National Reserve
- Walker's Cay National Park
- Tilloo Cay National Reserve
- Fowl Cays National Park

The Great Abaco Family Fitness Weekend takes place every March in Treasure Cay, attracting both domestic and international tourism. The events include an open water swim, sprint and Olympic triathlons, a children's race, and a 5k/10k fun run/walk. The Abaco Club features an 18 hole championship golf course; designed by Donald Steel and Tom Mackenzie, the course is home to Great Abaco Classic.

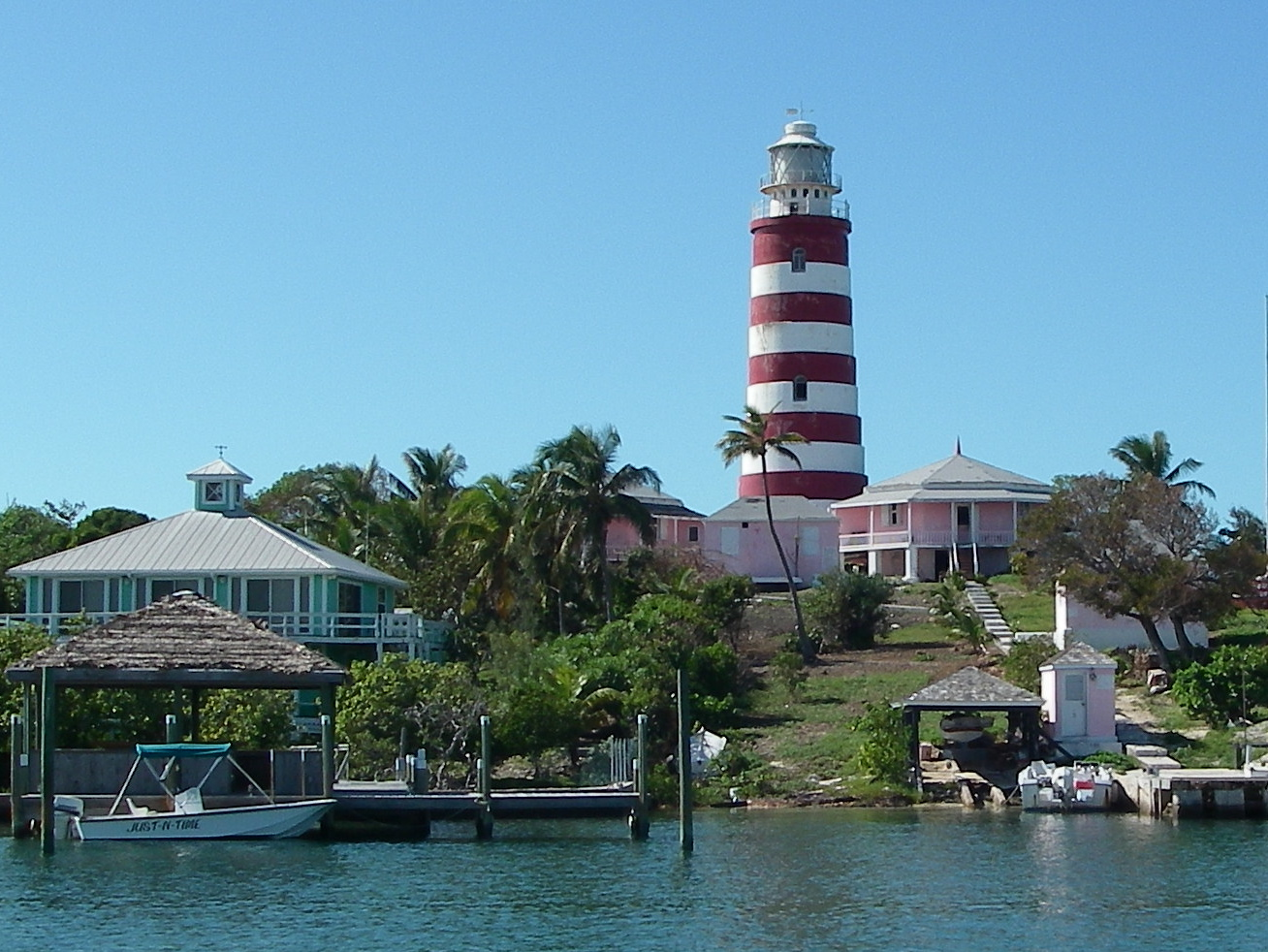
The red and white striped lighthouse at Hope Town in the Abaco Islands is a noted local landmark.

Fishing, diving, snorkeling, and boating are available in the Abacos. Green Turtle Cay has an interactive Bahamas Pig Tour and Hope Town has a historic lighthouse. Restaurants and bars serving Bahamian food can be found in the hotels on Abaco Island.

== Transportation ==
Marsh Harbour Airport (MHH) and Treasure Cay Airport (TCB) serve the needs of the Abacos, and all Abaco travel connects or originates in Florida or Atlanta. On the main island cars and boat rentals are available. On some of the cays, rental golf carts and boats are the main mode of transportation, along with bikes or scooters. Marsh Harbour Airport was the site of a plane crash on 25 August 2001, that claimed the lives of nine passengers; among the casualties was R&B singer Aaliyah.

The cays can be reached by ferries. The southern cays can be reached from Marsh Harbour and another ferry leaves from the Treasure Cay ferry dock about a half-hour from Marsh Harbour by road. Ferry service is also to be found between Nassau and Sandy Point on the southern end of Great Abaco on weekends.

=== Sandy Point ===
Sandy Point is a small settlement at the tip of southwest Abaco, Bahamas. It is the location of "Sandy Point Airport", which has yet to serve any regular scheduled carrier, and a new police station. Sandy Point also has a few shops, some churches and a few bonefish lodges. The annual "Homecoming and Conch Fest" is held around Bahamian Labour Day, the first Friday in June. In the 1990s, The Walt Disney Company bought Gorda Cay and renamed it Castaway Island and made it a stop on their "Island in the Sun" cruise ship offering. Many Disney employees live in Sandy Point. There is no public access for tourists from shore. Also off shore and a little more to the north, lies Moore's Island. It has two settlements "Hard Bargain" and "The Bight". Hole-in-the-Wall, which is the site of a lighthouse, may seem nearby but should be a trip unto itself and only in a 4-wheel-drive vehicle when coming from Marsh Harbour.

In 2005, an environmental management plan for a zone of Great Guana Cay, in the Abaco Islands, criticized Disney for poor management of a 90-acre (36.4 ha) tract of the island. Disney partially developed but then abandoned the place, which was to have been a cruise ship resort called Treasure Island. The report, by the University of Miami and the College of the Bahamas, blamed Disney for leaving hazardous materials, electrical transformers, and fuel tanks, as well as introducing invasive alien plants and insects that threaten the island's natural flora and fauna.

== Economy ==
The Abaco Islands have been long famous for shipbuilding. Their chief exports are lumber, fruit, and pearl shells. Crawfish (Caribbean spiny lobster) are exported to the United States. Pulpwood is shipped to a Florida plant for processing. Tourism is a major portion of the economy.

Tourism has grown to the 300,000 visitors mark in 2019. This growth makes the Abacos the second most visited destination in The Bahamas. The reason for the recent increase in tourism is because of the waters. Boating, swimming, and fishing are popular activities in the islands and cays that make up the Abaco archipelago, which have hosted fishing tournaments and regattas. The real estate sector has grown due to the growing tourism; Elbow Caw saw the most activity in 2018.

== Environment ==
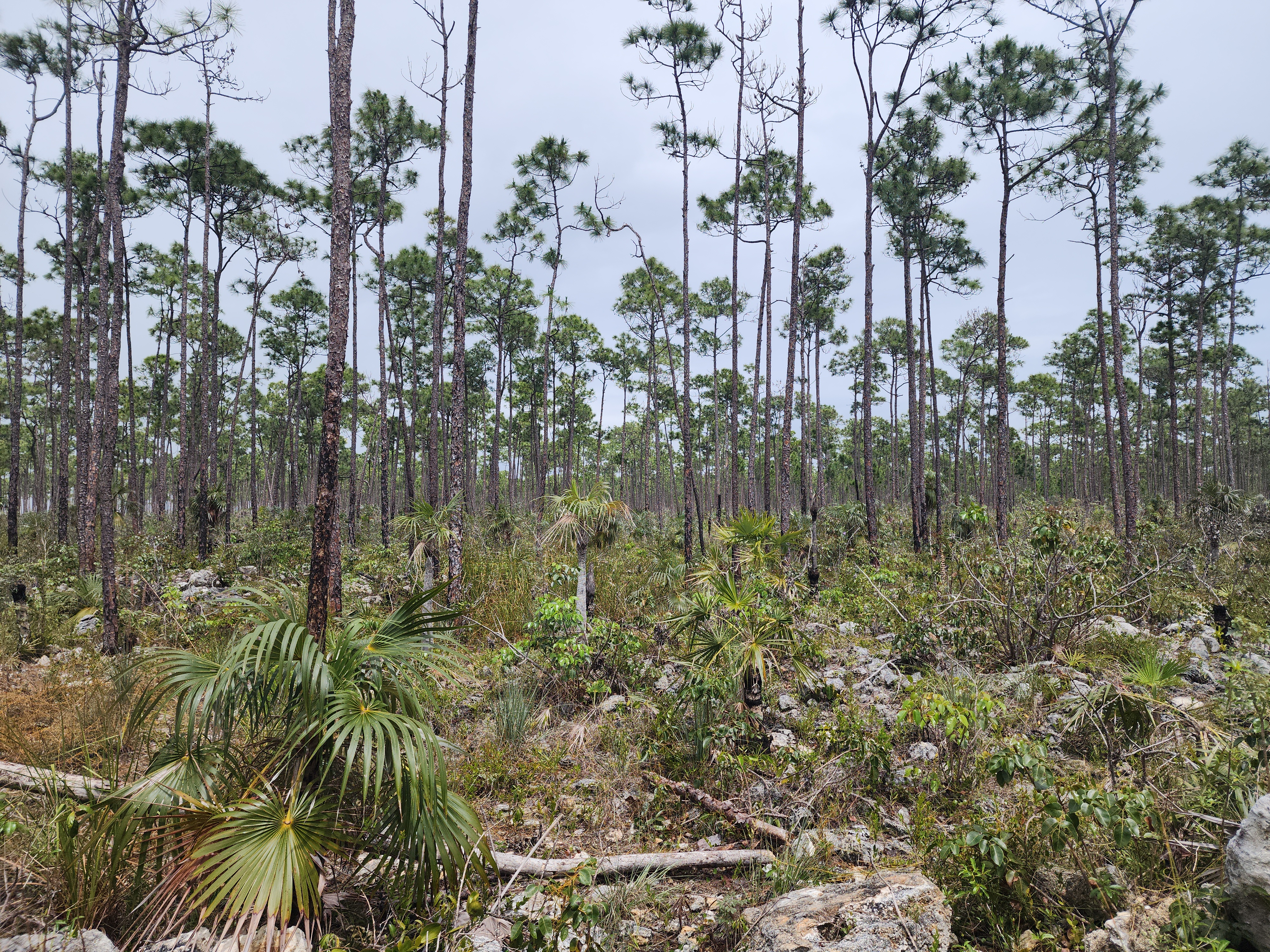
Bahamian pineyard on Great Abaco

The Abaco Islands boast important natural areas, especially important coral reef areas, barrier-island terrestrial habitats and large forests of Bahamian pine (Pinus caribaea var. bahamensis), some of which still contain old-growth trees. As development expands in the Abacos, local groups have begun to fight for the preservation of their natural resources, such as in the development case on Great Guana Cay.

Species of birds include the Bahamian subspecies of Cuban amazon (Amazona leucocephala bahamensis), which exists only in Cuba, the Cayman Islands, the southern Bahamas and Abaco. This population is unique in that it nests in limestone solution cavities rather than tree cavities. Abaco is also known for its intact elkhorn and staghorn coral structures, and for a breed of feral horse, the Abaco Barb, which became extinct in 2015.

== Notable people ==
- Thomas Winer Malone, boat builder
- Steven Gardiner, sprint athlete and Olympic medalist
- Shavez Hart, sprint athlete and Olympian
- Elroy McBride, sprint athlete who competed at the World Championships
