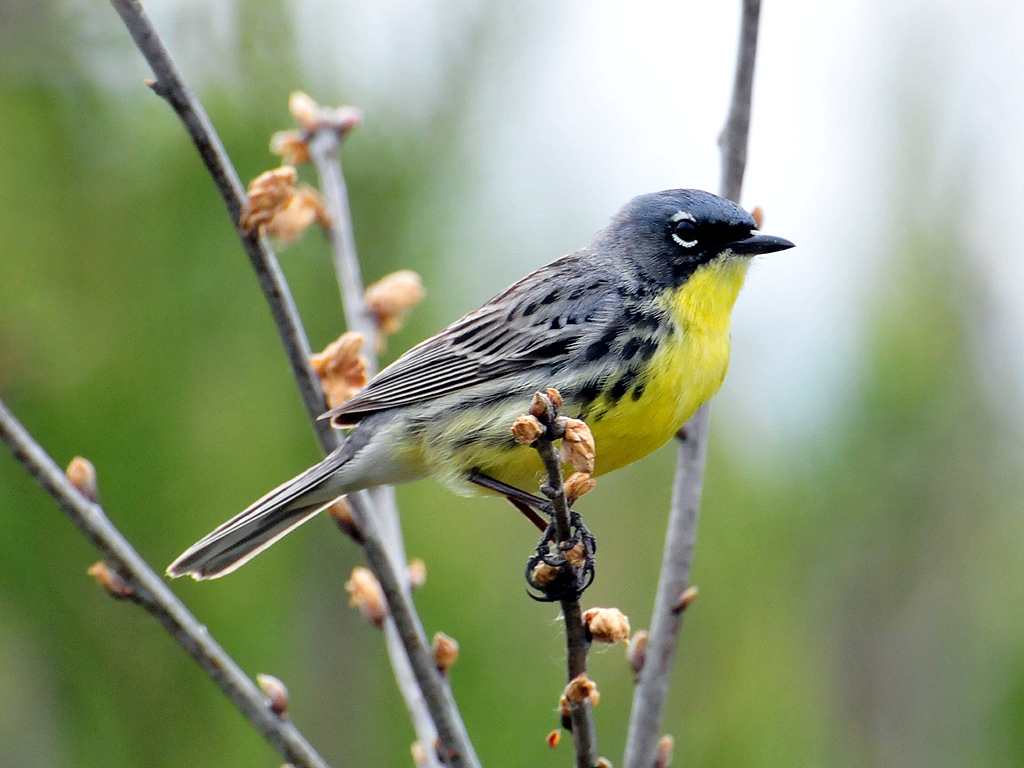
- Male in Michigan, United States

Conservation status
- Near Threatened (IUCN 3.1)

- Vulnerable (NatureServe)

Scientific classification
- Kingdom: Animalia
- Phylum: Chordata
- Class: Aves
- Order: Passeriformes
- Family: Parulidae
- Genus: Setophaga
- Species: S. kirtlandii

Binomial name
- Setophaga kirtlandii (Baird, 1852)
- The minimum range of S. kirtlandii in the early 1970s. As of 2019 the range has expanded considerably. Breeding range Winter range

Synonyms
- Sylvicola kirtlandii Baird, 1852; Dendroica kirtlandii (Baird, 1852); Dendroica kirtlandi (Baird, 1852, lapsus)

= Kirtland's warbler =

Species of bird

Kirtland's warbler (Setophaga kirtlandii), also known in Michigan by the common name jack pine bird, or the jack pine warbler, is a small songbird of the New World warbler family (Parulidae). Nearly extinct just years ago, populations have recovered due to the conservation efforts of the Kirtland's Warbler Conservation Team and its members. The birds require large areas, greater than 160 acres (65 hectares), of dense young jack pine for breeding habitat. This habitat was historically created by wildfire, but today is created through the harvest of mature jack pine (Pinus banksiana), and planting of jack pine seedlings.

The population of the species spends the spring and summer in its breeding range in the Great Lakes region of Canada (Ontario) and the United States (Wisconsin and Michigan, especially in the northeastern Lower Peninsula), and winters in the West Indies.

== Taxonomy ==
This species was first recorded by Europeans relatively late for a bird from eastern North America. The first specimen was shot at sea somewhere between the Abaco Islands of The Bahamas and Cuba in mid-October 1841 by the ornithologist Samuel Cabot III. However, the specimen was unrecognized as a new species in the private collection of Cabot's father, Boston merchant Samuel Cabot Jr., until it made its way to the Museum of the Smithsonian Institution in the 1860s.

Ten years later the holotype, a juvenile male, was shot on Jared Potter Kirtland's farm near Cleveland, Ohio, in mid-May 1851. It was used to formally describe the species as Sylvicola kirtlandii by Spencer Fullerton Baird in 1852. Baird first attributed the collection to Charles Pease (Kirtland's son-in-law) in his 1852 description, but by 1858 he had changed his story and was attributing it to Kirtland.

In 1858 Baird moved the species, still then only known from his single specimen, to the genus Dendroica, where it remained until the 2010s, when it (and all other Dendroica warblers) was merged into the genus Setophaga.

By 1865 only four individuals were known to have been collected. Baird lists the male specimen from the Cabot collection, the holotype, a first female specimen shot in 1860 near Cleveland and preserved by R. K. Winslow, and a fourth (which Winslow mentioned had also been killed near Cleveland but had not been preserved). Local naturalist Philo Romayne Hoy also mentioned having possibly seen the species once near the village of Racine, Ohio, in the 1850s.

=== Etymology ===
Baird decided to name the bird after Jared Potter Kirtland: "a gentleman to whom, more than any one living, we are indebted for a knowledge of the Natural History of the Mississippi Valley". The generic epithet Setophaga is from the genitive case of Ancient Greek σής, transliterated as sḗs, meaning "moth", and phagos, meaning "eating".

== Description ==
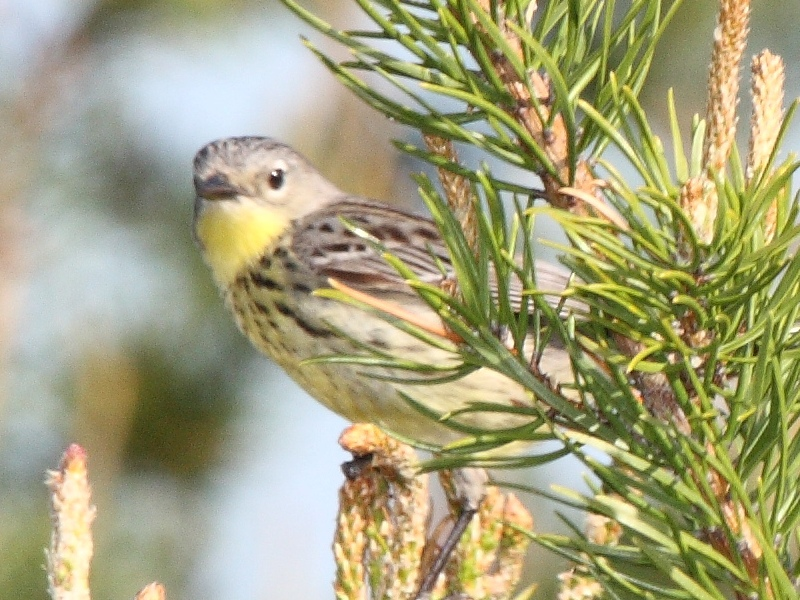
Female

Male Kirtland's warblers have bluish-grey upper body parts, with dark streaks on the back, yellow bellies, and dark streaks on the flanks and sides. It has black lores (cheeks) and a distinctive, large and conspicuous broken white eye ring, which it only shares with Setophaga coronata. Females and juveniles are similar, but are browner on the wings and back and are not as boldly or brightly marked. It frequently bobs its tail up and down, which is uncommon in northern warblers. At 14–15 cm (5.5–5.9 in) and 12.3–16 g (0.43–0.56 oz), it is the largest of the numerous warblers formerly classified in the genus Dendroica and is now the largest of the 35 or so species in the currently-accepted Setophaga genus. The Kirtland warbler has a wingspan of 22 cm (8.7 in). Its mating song is a loud chip-chip-chip-too-too-weet-weet often sung from the top of a snag (dead tree) or northern pin oak (Quercus ellipsoidalis) clump. This song can be heard over 400 m (1,300 ft) away in good conditions. In its overwintering grounds it does not sing but makes loud "chip" noises from low in dense bushes.

The eggs are a "delicate" pinkish white when fresh, fading to a dull white after a time. There are a few scattered sprinkles in various shades of brown and pink, these sprinkles and blotches concentrated at the top or form a sort of wreath at the larger end. The egg is not very glossy. It is 18 by 14mm in size. The shell is very thin.

=== Similar species ===
Baird compared and found it most similar to Setophaga coronata, finding it best distinguishable by having a nearly uniformly yellow belly, no conspicuous yellow rump or crown, less black in the feathers of the crown, and a considerably larger and stouter bill and feet. Henninger mentions he finds it to have a certain resemblance to S. magnolia. In The Bahamas it may be misidentified with S. dominica flavescens.

=== Hybrids ===
In late October 1997 a large hybrid Setophaga warbler was netted in the low elevation dry scrublands of the southernmost Dominican Republic, which based on morphology (plumage colour and anatomical measurements of size) and geography was most likely a hybrid between S. kirtlandii and S. fusca.

== Distribution ==
It was originally only known from Kirtland's home state of Ohio. In the mid 20th century the breeding range of Kirtland's warbler was reduced to a very limited area in the north of the Lower Peninsula of Michigan. In recent years, breeding pairs have been found in the Upper Peninsula of Michigan, Wisconsin, and southern Ontario due to the expanding population. The birds winter in Cuba, The Bahamas and the nearby Turks and Caicos Islands, where they are found on all islands investigated. A number also overwinter on Hispaniola, in the Dominican Republic. Overwintering birds have been collected and sighted a number of times in Florida. It has been recorded as a rare accidental on Bermuda and Jamaica, and there is an uncorroborated report from coastal Mexico. It has also been observed in the summer in Québec, although it is not known to breed there.

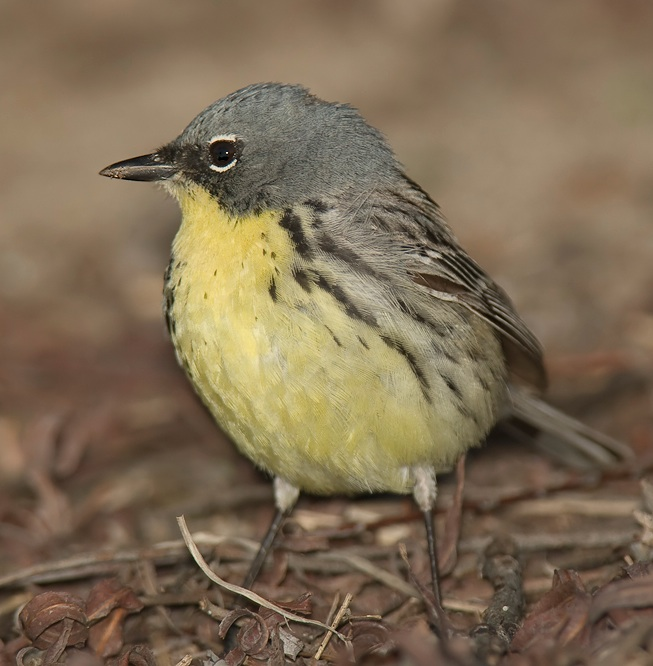
Kirtland's warbler found in northwest Ohio on May 14, 2010, on the shores of Lake Erie where migrant warblers occasionally appear in spring, perhaps before crossing into Ontario

Individuals first migrate from The Bahamas west to Florida and South Carolina in the second half of April to early May, and from there move further northwest and westwards until they reach the Mississippi River, which they then follow upstream to the mouth of the Ohio River during May. They reach their breeding grounds early in June, and then leave their breeding range between August and October.

== Breeding range and habitat ==
The Kirtland's warbler has a highly restricted breeding range in the Great Lakes region, breeding in jack pine (Pinus banksiana) forests in northern Michigan, Wisconsin, and Ontario. Its typical breeding habitat consists of large stands of young jack pine, about 4–25 years old and 5–20 feet (1.5–6.1 m) tall, with dense clumps of trees interspersed with small grassy openings, sedges, ferns, and low shrubs, usually on sandy glacial outwash plains. Females build nests on the ground under dense tree cover, commonly concealed by grasses, sedges, other ground vegetation, or the low branches of young jack pine or oak. Although the species is strongly associated with young jack pine habitat, researchers have reported that Kirtland's warblers have also bred in young red pine-dominated plantations in central Wisconsin where habitat structure approximates that of young jack pine stands.

=== Habitat ===
In their winter habitat, they have been found primarily in low "coppice" habitat, especially areas which have been cleared for slash-and-burn agriculture but have regrown after abandonment (98% of all records), with a preference for dense shrubbery with small openings here and there, no canopy and low ground cover. It has otherwise been found in all habitats on the islands, including, albeit uncommonly, suburban gardens and Bahamian pineyards, with the exception of high coppice which has never been clear cut -it has never been seen here. With rare exceptions this bird is almost always sighted from the ground to 3 m (9.8 ft) high (98%).

For breeding habitat it requires large areas of young jack pine on sandy soil. Kirtland's warblers occur in greatest numbers in large areas that have been clear cut or where a large wildfire has occurred. For breeding they require stands of young (6 to 20 year old, 2–4 m high) jack pine trees. Other common plants in this habitat are blueberry (Vaccinium angustifolium), sweet fern (Comptonia peregrina), Canada mayflower (Maianthemum canadense) and various grasses. Although it was initially believed to exclusively require jack pine stands, more recent research has found that the bird will also breed in some places in young stands of red pine (Pinus resinosa) of 10 to 15 years old. When the pine stands grow so tall so as to lose their lowest branches near the forest floor, the environment no longer provides sufficient cover. Such stands are ideally densely stocked with young pines, but also contain small occasional patches of open areas or with sparse tree cover.

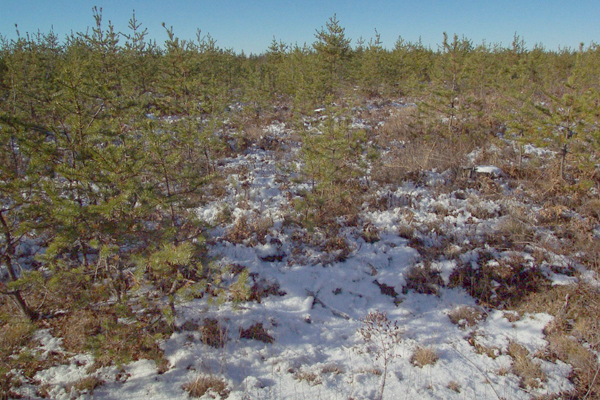
This Lower Peninsula jack pine stand was slightly too young in 2002, but by 2008 made good breeding habitat. By 2015–2020, the mature trees would form a forest nearly 20m high, rendering it unsuitable for Kirtland's warbler breeding.

==== Controversy ====
The status of the overwintering habitat has been contentious, with researchers disagreeing. Mayfield (1992, 1996) first stated that the bird inhabits the shrub layer. Lee et al. (1997) also believed that the warbler inhabits shrubs, but they concluded that the species is entirely dependent on pineyards, stating that before the advent of deforestation of the high coppice after the colonisation of The Bahamas by pre-colonial Lucayan peoples, the bird must have been restricted to the northwestern islands which harbour these pineyards and absent from central, eastern and southern islands such as Eleuthera. Sykes and Clench (1998), basing their analysis on 96 unambiguous records of both collected specimens and observations on thirteen different islands, as well as almost 451 observations over three months of the same two banded individuals on Eleuthera, refuted the claim, finding that by far most records were from regrown coppice after abandonment of agricultural fields. Like Mayfield, they state many of the earlier records used by Lee et al. were tainted by misidentification with S. dominica flavescens, a similar-looking subspecies that was not adequately described or illustrated at the time of the recordings. A few months later, Haney et al. (1998) published a repudiation of Sykes and Clench based on 101 warbler records, wherein they claimed the warblers do not prefer scrub coppice and reiterated their earlier assertion that the primary habitat of the birds was pineyards. They went even further in concluding that the world population of the warbler was not limited by the situation in their breeding range in Michigan, but that historic fluctuations in their population were instead being determined by the status of the pineyards in Bahamas. A detailed study by Wunderle et al. (2010) using a much larger sample size of new data from 153 capture sites and 499 observations, and investigations of the diet, found that Sykes and Clench had been correct, and there was no validity to the assertions of Lee, Walsh-McGehee and Haney. Jones et al. (2013), researching the warbler on an island where pineyards had never grown, hypothesized that a sampling bias for birds in pineyards had skewed the results of the research presented by Haney et al. Despite the evidence, Birdlife International, which performs the IUCN Red List assessments, has consistently shown preference for the Haney et al. interpretation, stating that the conclusion that "changes in population have occurred contemporaneously with the degradation and recovery of the north Bahamas pine ecosystem" is more compelling than that the recovery efforts in Michigan were having effects on the population size.

Haney et al. stated that another reason that this warbler was most likely restricted to the pineyards habitat was because there was no low coppice habitat available until the arrival of the first human colonists on the islands, the Lucayans some 1,000 years ago, due to there being no mechanism that could destroy the natural high coppice of the islands. However, in 2007, Wunderle et al. pointed out that hurricanes might produce such young successional habitat, albeit with no empirical evidence; they theorized that perhaps this warbler species had specifically evolved to take advantage of such weather phenomena.

=== Behaviour ===
Yearlings and first-time breeders explore to find new breeding grounds, but ringed males have been observed to loyally return to the same nesting locality years after year; a male first ringed at CFB Petawawa in Ontario in 2006 returned for six consecutive years. This individual is estimated to have reached the age of nine, but in general the species are thought to have much shorter lifespans; males usually become four years old, and females are thought to only survive for 2.5 years on average.

One study found that 85% of the singing males are able to attract mates.

A warbler occupies a breeding territory of 2.7 to 3.4ha depending on location, but a larger wintering territory of 6.9 to 8.3ha depending on the island. They construct their nests on the ground, well concealed by lowest living branches of the jack pines and other vegetation. The nest is usually at the base of a tree, next to a down log or other structure. Eggs are laid in May to June.

=== Diet ===
It depends heavily during overwintering on the berries of Lantana involucrata, which is a very common successional shrub a few years after agriculture has been abandoned in a particular field. It is also said to eat the berries of Erithalis fruticosa and Chiococca alba. Of 331 observations of two warblers on Eleuthera in 1986, 76% were of foraging on Lantana, 8% were in Tournefortia volubilis, 4% in snowberry, 3.5% in Acacia rigens, 3.3% in Erithalis, 1.8% in Zanthoxylum fagara, and 1% Casuarina equisetifolia. Plants they were found foraging in at less than 1% were Sideroxylon salicifolium, Pithecellobium keyense, Tabebuia bahamensis and Scleria lithosperma. In its summering range this species feeds on blueberries and on insects such as spittlebugs, aphids and ants.

=== Interactions with other species ===
Jack pine is a species of pine with a distribution that spans almost across North America. Its cones open only after trees have been cleared away by forest fires or, after logging, in the summer sun. The ice age climate was somewhat drier overall and almost all of its present-day range was covered by solid ice as late as 10,000 to 15,000 years ago. Pollen analysis shows that the jack pine was almost non-existent between the Appalachian Mountains and the Great Plains during this period, with the possible exception of tiny isolated relict populations, which presents a mystery as to where the Kirtland's warbler survived during this period. Mayfield suggests that the species was restricted during this age to the southeastern Atlantic coast, which might explain its modern overwintering range in the Bahamas as opposed to Mexico, as well as why it appears to be closer related to Caribbean warbler species. The jack pine and the warbler likely colonized the Midwest around 10,000 years ago.

Without human intervention, the warblers are severely impacted by nest parasitism by the brown-headed cowbird. Blue jays prey on the nests and are a nuisance species because individual jays repeatedly allow themselves to get caught in the same traps used to exterminate the cowbirds of the nesting region.

== Conservation ==
The Kirtland's Warbler Conservation Team is an integral part of post-delisting monitoring efforts and provides an important forum for sharing information, coordinating management efforts and ensuring that effective adaptive management occurs.

=== Decline ===
As global climate changed after the ice age through the last 10 millennia or so, jack pine, and consequently also Kirtland's warbler, shifted their habitat north. The cold-hardy jack pine now grows as far as north as the Northwest Territories.

The Kirtland's warbler has historically always been rare, with the species first recorded quite late for a bird from the eastern US: between the 1840s to 1851. Only four or five birds were seen in the first two decades after, with the breeding grounds and first nest not recorded until 1903 in Michigan.

It is still unclear to scientists how a species with such narrow habitat requirements was able to survive to modern times. One theory is that during the ice ages, which lasted much longer than interglacials, Kirtland's warbler had a more stable distribution and habitat; i.e. the species exists as a glacial relict during geologically brief periods of warming global temperatures. It is quite possible that colonization by Europeans actually temporarily boosted populations of the bird. Most of the Lower Peninsula of Michigan was once covered in vast tracts of old growth white pine (Pinus strobus), the final stage of succession in the woodlands of that region, but these were all harvested by the early 19th century for construction in the growing cities and towns around the Great Lakes and along the East Coast. This created the conditions for the extensive woodlots of jack pine, a pioneer species, found today.

In 1871, fed by dry conditions, high winds and piles of logging slash, a massive forest fire swept through lower Michigan, with another large fire in The Thumb of the Lower Peninsula, and a further huge forest fire on the Wisconsin-Michigan border and yet another around Windsor, Ontario. In 1881 another massive conflagration burned down the forests in The Thumb, which eliminated the last of the original white pine woodlands of Michigan. This period coincides with the era where most Kirtland's warbler specimens were collected, reflecting a possible peak in population size. However ornithologists were then unaware where it bred, and almost all these birds were taken in The Bahamas and Turks and Caicos or along the migration route. While no warblers were seen or killed in The Bahamas by the collector Henry Bryant in the 1850s and 1860s (despite his extensive searches), many dozens of warblers were recorded on almost all of the islands by the 1880s and 1890s. Charles Johnson Maynard collected 24 from New Providence during one two and a half month excursion in 1884. Maynard was a prolific collector, securing in this and subsequent years another ten on the same island almost a dozen on Eleuthera, and a further two on Cat Island, but many other collectors were able to obtain quite a number of specimens in The Bahamas during these decades.

In July 1903, the taxidermist Norman Asa Wood was presented with a specimen by a student at the University of Michigan, and promptly travelled to the area it was killed, where he found the first nest ever recorded for the species near the banks of the Au Sable River. He also found a second nest; both nests had chicks and one held a single unhatched egg. Wood killed all the birds he could (eight managed to escape his gun), and secured the nests and egg. He tried to rear some of the chicks, but these soon died. Including chicks, he returned to the city with fifteen specimens, the biggest collection of the species at the time in the USA. It was thus one of the last bird species of North America to have its nesting habits discovered. The following year Edward Arnold travelled to a nearby locality in June and found the third nest ever, with four eggs. He was able to capture both the male and female on the nest simply with his hands. Including these, 25 birds had been taken in Michigan by 1904, and another eight recorded, which made it clear that Michigan was the main stronghold of the breeding range of this warbler.

Considering the vernacular name of this bird was "jack pine bird" in Michigan, Wood was certainly not the first to discover that this species is specifically resident in jack pines, but in 1904 he was the first to publish these findings in a scientific journal. Woods also noted that, even in its breeding haunts, the bird was quite rare, and was not present in all areas of jack pine. This same year the migration route was first detailed in a paper by Charles C. Adams. Adams used dates of records of this bird in different states to show it migrated according to a very tight schedule, but used quite a broad route north spanning from the Mississippi River to South Carolina. He thought this might indicate that there were more breeding grounds to the west and east than those in Michigan which Woods had publicised. The records Adams was using are from the 1880s and 1890s and birds were shot as far west as Missouri and Minnesota, areas where the species has not been seen since.

In the 1920s, a recognised expert on this species was a Chicago teenager named Nathan F. Leopold (most well known for being one half of the crime pair Leopold and Loeb) who, in his scientific journal articles, published a number of important discoveries. One was that the age of the jack pines in a stand is the most pertinent determinant in the suitability of a particular terrain as a breeding habitat for the species, and another discovery was that the population was subject to a deleterious brood parasitism by the brown-headed cowbird.

Kirtland's warbler is highly susceptible to nest parasitism by this cowbird. Brown-headed cowbirds feed mostly on seeds from grasses and weeds, with some crop grains. Insects such as grasshoppers and beetles, often caught as cows and horses stir them into movement, make up about a quarter of a cowbird's diet. Development and fragmentation of forests in the eastern United States have allowed brown-headed cowbirds to greatly expand their range eastward. One study from 1931 to 1971 found 59% of the warbler nests parasitised in comparison to 5% of the nests in the study area of all other bird species combined, another study found 48% from 1903 to 1949; another found 86% rate of parasitism; and a last study found 69% of the warbler nests afflicted from 1957 to 1971. In 1971 the third decennial census counted 201 singing males, whereas the 1961 census had found 501 breeding pairs, showing a 60% decrease in population over the 1960s.

The first census of the species was performed in 1951, organised in part by a young Harold F. Mayfield, who would eventually spend the rest of life researching this species. 432 males were counted, half of these in just two areas where fires had raged in the 1930s. The second of what was supposed to be a decennial census program in 1961 showed an increase in population, with 502 males counted; many of these were still found at the sites of the two 1930s fires, a quarter was now resident at the site of a large fire from 1946.

The population reached a low of 167 singing males in 1974, and in 1994 only 18 square kilometres (6.9 sq mi) of suitable breeding habitat was available.

=== Recovery ===
It was listed as endangered in the US in 1967. In 1971 a recovery plan was developed. The plan entailed the management of state and federal land through clear cutting, controlled burning and planting jack pine to expand suitable nesting habitat for Kirtland's warbler, as well as having the government acquire more land for this purpose. The other components were to limit public access land during nesting season, to conduct annual censuses of the warbler population, and lastly to intensively control the cowbird population.

A 1966 study found that shooting and trapping the cowbirds could reduce parasitism from 65% to 21%, and in 1972 cowbird control efforts commenced. The cowbird traps were 4 by 4 ft. and 6 ft. high with a recessed entrance hole at the top, and worked using sunflower seed bait, tape recorders playing birdsongs and decoy cowbirds which attracted more cowbirds. Cowbirds are asphyxiated in plastic bags using car exhaust fumes. Once a day during breeding season, or when the traps had collected 30 to 40 birds, the traps were serviced to destroy cowbirds. Other trapped bird species were banded and released, and some twelve cowbirds were left in the trap as decoys. Less cowbirds are caught as the season progresses, and radio-tracked cowbirds indicate that females are sedentary during the season. In the first year, 1972, 2,200 cowbirds were eliminated using a single trap, and only 6% of the warbler nests in the region were parasitised compared to 69% previously. Average clutch size in the region almost doubled. In 1973 the program was expanded to four traps, which caught 3,300 cowbirds and resulted in no parasitism that year. That same year 216 singing male warblers were recorded an increase of 9.2% from the 200 males recorded in 1972, and the first increase recorded ever. Thus the control program was considered a success, and the following year 22 cowbird traps were deployed, removing over 4,000 cowbirds across the region. Although only 167 singing male warblers were recorded in 1974, nevertheless the large number of fledglings meant the traps were effective. As of 2016, the cowbird traps still capture 4,000 cowbirds a season. Effective blue jay management involves transporting a few hundred jays a year dozens of miles away to be released.

Today the habitat of Kirtland's warbler is no longer being preserved by prescribed burns as these have proved too difficult to control (a forest service employee named James Swiderski was immolated during one of these burns in 1980), and the species is entirely dependent on staggered harvests by the timber industry for its survival. Some 76,000 hectares are reserved for this purpose on the Lower Peninsula of Michigan, of which some 15,000 are maintained as young jack pine breeding habitat for the bird. The Michigan Department of Natural Resources, the U.S. Fish and Wildlife Service and the U.S. Forest Service coordinate the clear cutting of tracts of 50 year old jack pines on 23 Kirtland's warbler management units. These managed units total 220,000 acres (89,000 ha). After cutting new trees are planted in a specified pattern to mimic the natural habitat the warbler needs, with clearings and dense thickets.

In 2004 Kirtland's warbler had been observed in Ontario and the Upper Peninsula of Michigan, and rarely recorded in northwest Ohio, where the numbers of recorded birds are increasing. Beginning in 2005 a small number have been observed in Wisconsin. In 2007 three Kirtland's warbler nests were discovered in central Wisconsin and one at CFB Petawawa in Ontario, providing a sign that they are recovering and expanding their range once again. The Wisconsin population continues to grow, with 53 individuals and twenty nests recorded in 2017.

In the IUCN Red List the Kirtland's warbler was classified as vulnerable to extinction since 1994, but was listed as near threatened in 2005 due to its recovery. Although there seemed to be no more than 5,000 Kirtland's warblers as of late 2007, four years earlier they had numbered just 2500–3000. Since the recovery plan began in the 1970s, the numbers of Kirtland's warbler have steadily risen, with an estimated population of 5,000 in 2016. A world total of 2,365 singing males were reported in the 2015 census. By 2018 there were an estimated 2,300 pairs and the population had continued to grow over the previous sixteen years according to the U.S. Fish and Wildlife Service Midwest Region. In 2019 the population has been above the recovery goal of 1,000 pairs for seventeen years.

The birds depend on The Bahamas and adjacent territories during winter; in 1998 their winter habitat was judged to be extremely widespread and it was calculated that there is enough area and habitat in the Bahamas to house a population of roughly more than 500,000 birds. The most destructive threat in the winter range are thought to be house cats, at least on some islands.

If Haney et al. are correct in arguing that the species does not overwinter in scrub coppice habitats in The Bahamas, but instead in pineyards, and the abundance of this species is in fact limited by changes in this pineyard habitat, the conservation efforts in Michigan may be insufficient for species recovery. Some Michigan locals have questioned the cost and point of the program. Habitat and cowbird management cost $1 million per year as of 2003. In the 1990s this was garnered from a carbon sequestration fund, but that source of financing has been terminated. Management costs were estimated at $1.5 to 2 million per year in 2008, however, the payments by timber companies for the sale of jack pine for manufacturing paper and wood pulp offsets some costs, and the species brings bird-watching tourists to the region which is an economic boon to local businesses. Survival of this species will require management that will need to continue in perpetuity. An endowment fund to ensure a permanent funding source for the species has been discussed as an option.

There is a Kirtland's warbler festival in Roscommon, Michigan, which is sponsored in part by Kirtland Community College (which is named in honour of the bird). The festival is held annually during the first full weekend of June.

==== Canada ====
Until 2007 Kirtland's warblers had never been known to have bred in Canada, with the exception of one ambiguous possible record from near Midhurst, Ontario, in 1945. The first bird was collected in the country in 1900 when a specimen was secured on Toronto Island. The bird was then seen in the country in 1916 at the army base of CFB Petawawa by a military dentist, Paul Harrington; the same dentist made the third sighting of Canada at the same location in 1939, and in the next 65 years a bit more than two dozen sightings of the bird were made in the country, although only a few are verified. In 1979 it was declared an endangered species of Canada on the basis that it may have once bred in Ontario. In 2006 suddenly three birds were recorded at Petawawa, and the subsequent year the first ever nest was recorded at the same locality. The habitat at this location appears to have been maintained due to fires stemming from military training exercises. After 2007 the bird has bred almost every year at Petawawa, with the birds here fledged 27 young by 2014, and it has been reported at additional locations in central Ontario.

The government of Ontario published a recovery strategy for the Kirtland's warbler in 2016. A new mixed red and jack pine stand was planted at a location in Simcoe County in 2018 in the hopes of attracting the warbler, of which a sighting in the area had earlier been reported. Red pine was interspersed with the jack pine because the latter is relatively worthless as lumber, and it was hoped this configuration would make the project more economically sustainable.

==== Delisting ====
Prior to being delisted from the United States Fish and Wildlife Service list of endangered mammals and birds in 2019, the Kirtland's warbler had been listed as "endangered" under the Endangered Species Act of 1973. Since delisting, continued monitoring is being used to ensure that the species remains secure.

=== Protected areas ===
It has been regularly recorded in the following protected areas:

- Abaco National Park, Abaco, The Bahamas.
- Algonquin Provincial Park, Ontario, Canada.
- Huron–Manistee National Forests, Michigan, US.
- Lucayan National Park, Grand Bahama, The Bahamas.
- Point Pelee National Park, Essex County, Ontario, Canada.
- Rand Nature Centre (as Pinelands Wilderness Sanctuary), Grand Bahama, The Bahamas.
- Tawas Point State Park, Michigan, US.

== See also ==
- Mutualism (biology)
- Kirtland's Warbler Wildlife Management Area
