= Black Sound Cay National Reserve =

National park on Green Turtle Cay in North Abaco, Bahamas

- IUCN category Ia (strict nature reserve)
- Location within Bahamas
- Location: Green Turtle Cay, the Bahamas
- Coordinates: 26.7597°N 77.3205°W
- Area: 2 acres (0.81 ha)
- Established: 1 November 1988
- Governing body: Bahamas National Trust
- Website: bnt.bs/black-sound-cay-national-reserve/

Black Sound Cay National Reserve is a national park on Green Turtle Cay in North Abaco, the Bahamas. The park was established in 1988 and has an area of 2 acres (0.81 ha).

== Flora and fauna ==
The mangrove area includes red, white and black mangroves, and buttonwood, creating sheltered nursery waters for groupers, crawfish and conch. The park provides important habitat for birds such as the white-cheeked pintail and the West Indian whistling duck, and for migratory bird species including the painted bunting, indigo bunting, American redstart, black-and-white warbler and magnolia warbler.
