= Thomas Malone =

This is a list of people named Thomas, Tommy, or Tom Malone.

== Law and politics ==
- Thomas Malone (politician) (1875–1926), Canadian politician
- Thomas H. Malone (1834–1906), judge, dean of Vanderbilt University Law School, Confederate veteran
- Tom Malone (judge) (born 1953), judge on the Kansas Court of Appeals

== Sports ==
- Tom Malone (American football) (born 1984), American football player
- Thomas Malone (cricketer) (1876–1933), New Zealand cricketer
- Tom Malone (hurler) (born 1952), Irish hurler
- Tom Malone, steeplechase jockey, rode in the 2008 Grand National
- Tommy Malone (basketball) (1918–1968), Irish basketball player

== Other people ==
- Thomas W. Malone (born 1952), professor at the MIT Sloan School of Management
- Thomas Winer Malone (born 1929), Bahamian wooden boat builder
- Thomas F. Malone (1917–2013), American geophysicist
- Tom Malone (musician) (born 1947), jazz trombonist for the Blues Brothers
- Tommy Malone, member of The Subdudes rock band

== See also ==
- Tom Malone Prize, an Australian glass art prize at the Art Gallery of Western Australia
