= Blue Holes National Park =

National park in Andros, Bahamas

- IUCN category II (national park)
- Location within Bahamas
- Location: Andros, the Bahamas
- Nearest city: Nassau
- Coordinates: 24.7896°N 77.9448°W
- Area: 40,000 acres (162 km^{2})
- Established: 2002
- Governing body: Bahamas National Trust
- Website: bnt.bs/blue-holes-national-park/

Blue Holes National Park is a national park in Andros, the Bahamas. The park was established in 2002 and has an area of 40,000 acres (162 km^{2}).

== Flora and fauna ==
The park's blue holes contain various unique cavefish and invertebrates. The park also contains thousands of acres of pine forest, which provide habitat for birds such as the Bahama oriole, great lizard cuckoo, western spindalis, western red-legged thrush, black-faced grassquit and Cuban emerald.
