= Ataenius clitellarius =

Scientific classification
- Kingdom: Animalia
- Phylum: Arthropoda
- Clade: Pancrustacea
- Class: Insecta
- Order: Coleoptera
- Suborder: Polyphaga
- Infraorder: Scarabaeiformia
- Family: Scarabaeidae
- Genus: Ataenius
- Species: A. clitellarius

Binomial name
- Ataenius clitellarius Petrovitz, 1973

Species of beetle

Ataenius clitellarius is a species of beetle of the family Scarabaeidae. It is found in Argentina, Brazil (Bahia, Minas Gerais, Pará, Santa Catarina, São Paulo) and Paraguay.

== Description ==
Adults reach a length of about 4–4.8 mm (0.16–0.19 in). They have an oblong oval, moderately shiny, reddish brown to dark castaneous body, with the anterior of the head, sides of the pronotum and legs lighter.

== Life history ==
Specimens have been collected on pastures, on stands with Pinus caribaea bahamensis and taken from ant refuge deposit.
