= North and South Marine Parks =

Marine parks in the Bahamas

- IUCN category II (national park)
- Location within Bahamas
- Location: East of Andros, the Bahamas
- Nearest city: Nassau
- Coordinates: 24.8748°N 77.8889°W
- Area: 5,000 acres (20 km^{2}; 8 sq mi)
- Established: 2002
- Governing body: Bahamas National Trust
- Website: bnt.bs/north-south-marine-parks/

The North and South Marine Parks are national parks off the eastern coast of Andros, the Bahamas. The parks were established in 2002 and have an area of 5,000 acres (20 km^{2}; 8 sq mi).

== Flora and fauna ==
The parks contain a barrier reef with associated coral and other wildlife.
