= Kirtland's Warbler Wildlife Management Area =

Protected area in Michigan, United States

- IUCN category Ib (wilderness area)
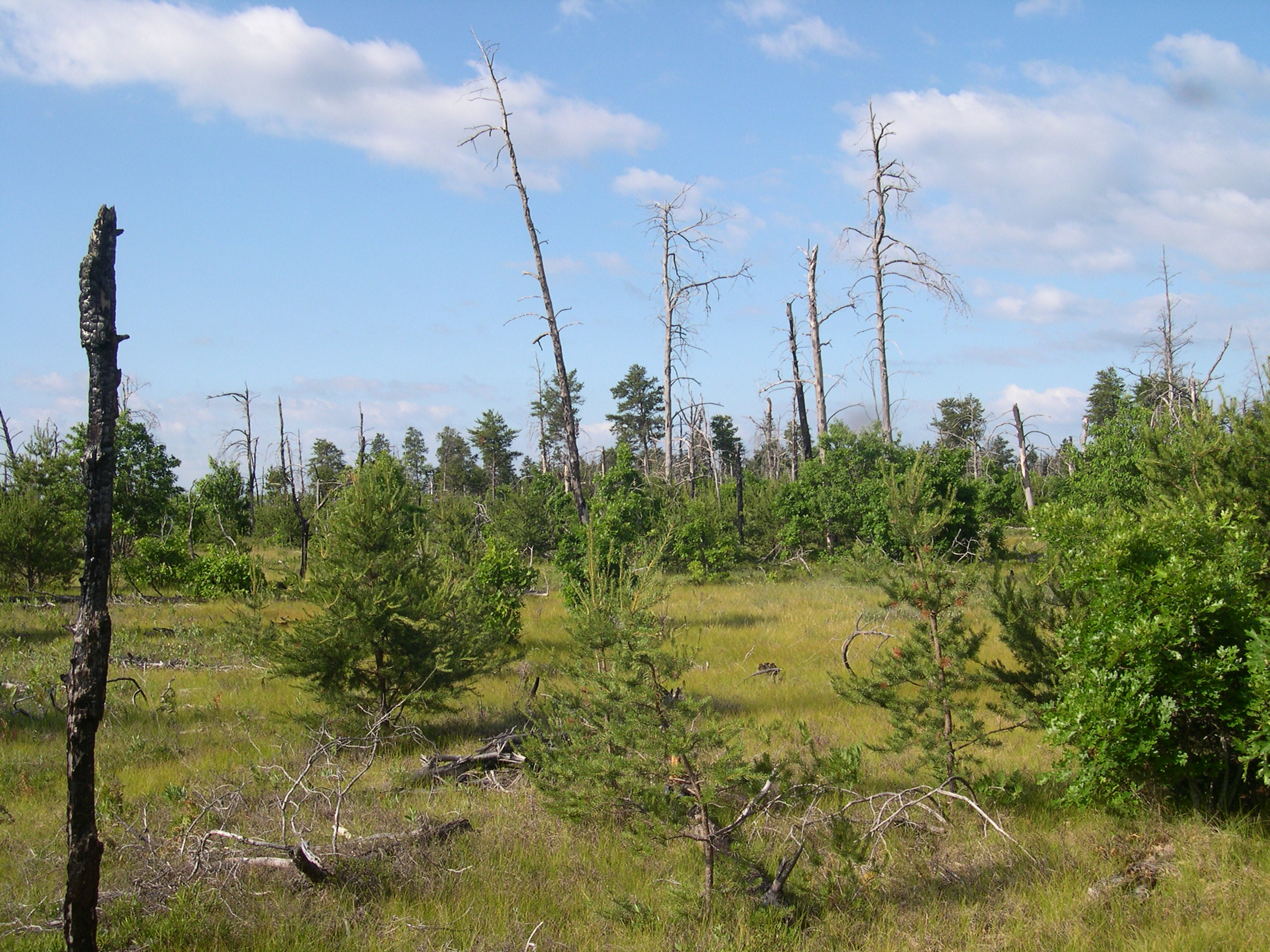

- Location within Michigan Location within the United States
- Location: northern Lower Michigan
- Nearest city: Grayling, Michigan
- Coordinates: 44°45′N 84°45′W
- Area: 6,684.46 acres (27.0510 km^{2})
- Governing body: U.S. Fish and Wildlife Service
- Website: Kirtlands Warbler Wildlife Management Area

The Kirtland's Warbler Wildlife Management Area is administered by the United States Fish and Wildlife Service, and is located in northern Lower Michigan.

The Kirtland's warbler is a Near Threatened neotropical migratory bird which were previously endangered. The breeding range of this species is primarily restricted to the northern Lower Peninsula of Michigan, and several locations in Michigan's Upper Peninsula and Wisconsin. This species winters on Bahamian islands in the Caribbean. Kirtland's Warbler Wildlife Management Area is located throughout eight counties in the northern Lower Peninsula of Michigan. Staff from Seney National Wildlife Refuge (Seney, Michigan) is responsible for land management at the refuge. Guided tours of parts of the refuge are available at the city of Grayling, around which the widespread parcels of this refuge are centralized.
