= Pelican Cays Land and Sea Park =

National park in Central Abaco, Abaco Islands, Bahamas

- Location within Bahamas
- Location: Central Abaco, the Bahamas
- Coordinates: 26.399°N 76.992°W
- Area: 2,100 acres (8 km^{2})
- Established: 1972
- Governing body: Bahamas National Trust
- Website: bnt.bs/pelican-cays-land-and-sea-park/

Pelican Cays Land and Sea Park is a national park in Central Abaco, the Abaco Islands, the Bahamas. The park was established in 1972 and has an area of 2,100 acres (8 km^{2}). The park's marine environment contains an extensive coral reef and undersea cave habitat, which provide opportunities for snorkelling and underwater diving.

== Flora and fauna ==
Over 170 species of plants and animals have been documented within the park's land and sea areas, including loggerhead and green sea turtles, bottlenose dolphins, and nesting bridled terns.
