= Rand Nature Centre =

- IUCN category Ib (wilderness area)
- Location within Bahamas
- Location: Freeport, Grand Bahama, the Bahamas
- Coordinates: 26.5382°N 78.6719°W
- Area: 100 acres (40 ha)
- Established: 1992
- Governing body: Bahamas National Trust
- Website: bnt.bs/rand-nature-centre/

The Rand Nature Centre is a national park in Freeport, Grand Bahama, the Bahamas. The park was established in 1992 and has an area of 100 acres (40 ha).

== Flora and fauna ==
The park contains at least 130 species of native plants, including whiskbroom fern, uniola, agave and love vine. The park's native pine forest hosts a number of bird species, including western red-legged thrushes, Cuban emerald hummingbirds, La Sagra's flycatchers and Bahama yellowthroats.
