= Moriah Harbour Cay National Park =

National park in the Bahamas

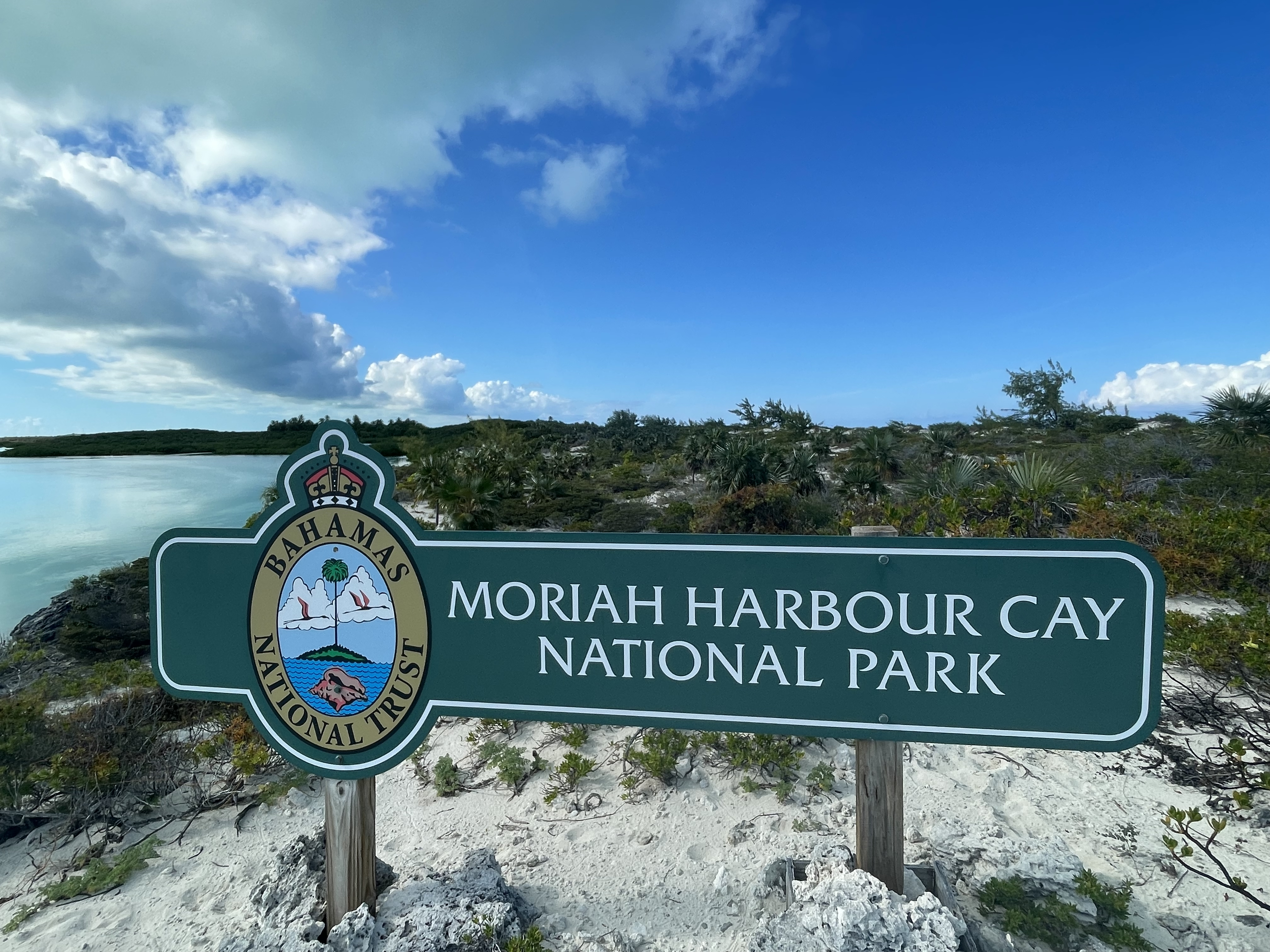

- Location within Bahamas
- Location: Exuma, the Bahamas
- Coordinates: 23.46133°N 75.67548°W
- Area: 16,800 acres (68 km^{2})
- Established: 2002
- Governing body: Bahamas National Trust
- Website: bnt.bs/explore/exuma/moriah-harbour-cay-national-park/

Moriah Harbour Cay National Park is a national park in Exuma, the Bahamas. The reserve was established in 2002 and, after expansion in 2015, has an area of 16,800 acres (68 km^{2}).

== Flora and fauna ==
On land, the park provides nesting sites for gull-billed and least terns, nighthawks, oystercatchers, plovers, and a resident pair of ospreys. Plants found at the park include buttonwoods, bay cedar, palmettos and sea oats. The park's mangroves provide a nursery for crabs, crawfish, conch, mangrove snappers, yellowtails and groupers.
