= Crab Replenishment Reserve =

National park in Andros, the Bahamas

- IUCN category II (national park)
- Location within Bahamas
- Location: Andros, the Bahamas
- Nearest city: Nassau
- Coordinates: 24.6596°N 77.7829°W
- Area: 4,000 acres (16 km^{2})
- Established: 2002
- Governing body: Bahamas National Trust
- Website: bnt.bs/crab-replenishment-reserve/

The Crab Replenishment Reserve is a national park in Andros, the Bahamas. The park was established in 2002 and has an area of 4,000 acres (16 km^{2}).

== Flora and fauna ==
The park provides habitat for land crabs.
