= Bonefish Pond National Park =

National park in New Providence, The Bahamas

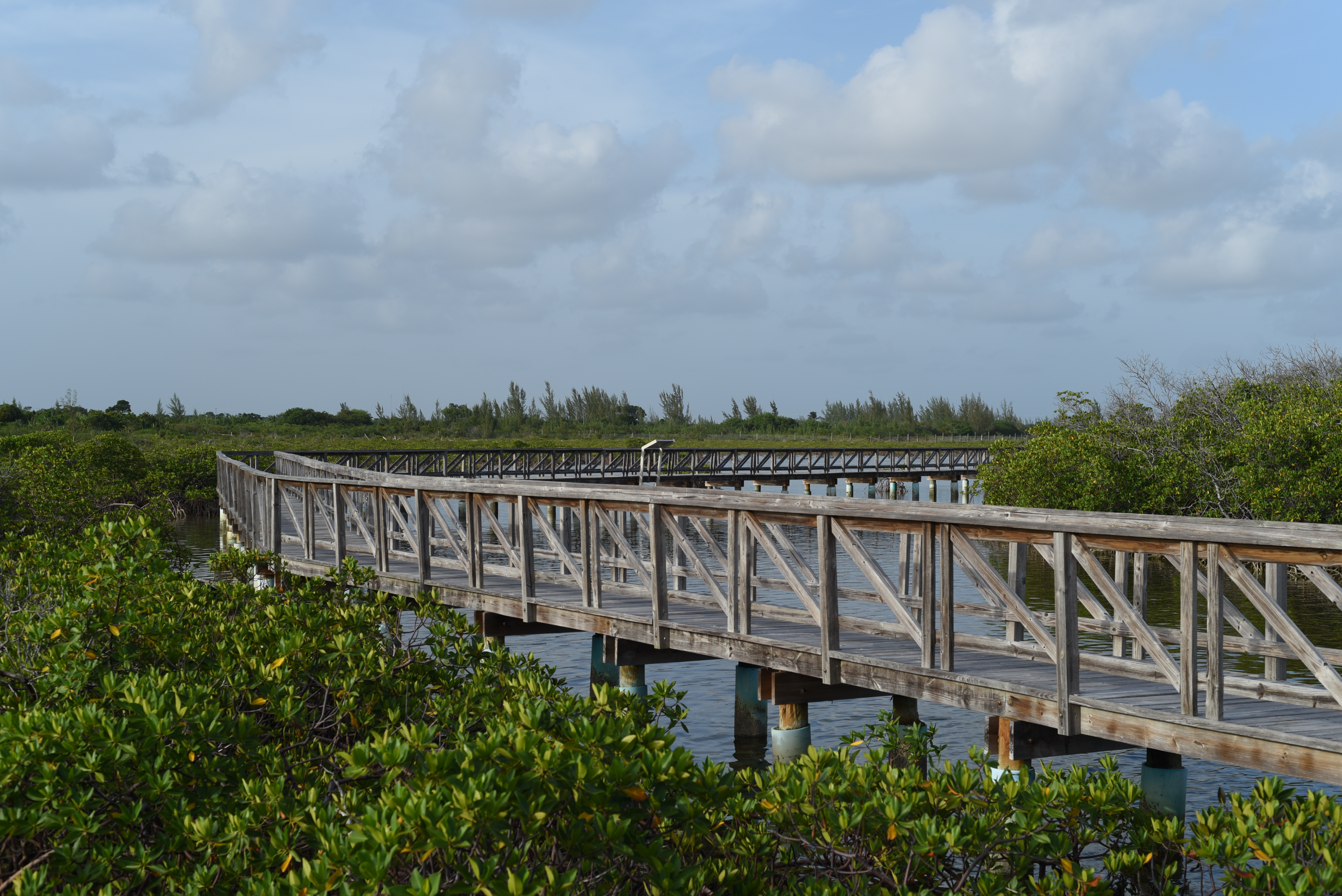
- Interactive map of Bonefish Pond National Park
- Location: New Providence, The Bahamas
- Nearest city: Nassau
- Coordinates: 24.9922°N 77.3889°W
- Area: 1,235 acres (5 km^{2})
- Established: 2002
- Governing body: Bahamas National Trust
- Website: bnt.bs/bonefish-pond/

Bonefish Pond National Park is a national park in New Providence, The Bahamas. The park was established in 2002 and has an area of 1,235 acres (5 km^{2}).

== Flora and fauna ==
The park provides an important nursery for crawfish and conch. Prior to 2013, due to inappropriate waste disposal, an area of the park contained no fish. This wetland was restored with the planting of red mangroves, encouraging population by fish species including snapper, damselfish, needlefish, barracuda and bonefish.
