= Tilloo Cay National Reserve =

Park in Bahamas

- Location within Bahamas
- Location: Hope Town, the Bahamas
- Coordinates: 26.4539°N 76.9873°W
- Area: 11 acres (4 ha)
- Established: 1990
- Governing body: Bahamas National Trust
- Website: bnt.bs/tilloo-cay-national-reserve/

Tilloo Cay National Reserve is a national park in Hope Town, the Abaco Islands, the Bahamas. The reserve was established in 1990 and spans across an area of 11 acres (4 ha).

== Flora and fauna ==
The reserve is considered an important nesting site for the white-tailed tropicbird.
