= Primeval Forest National Park =

National park in The Bahamas

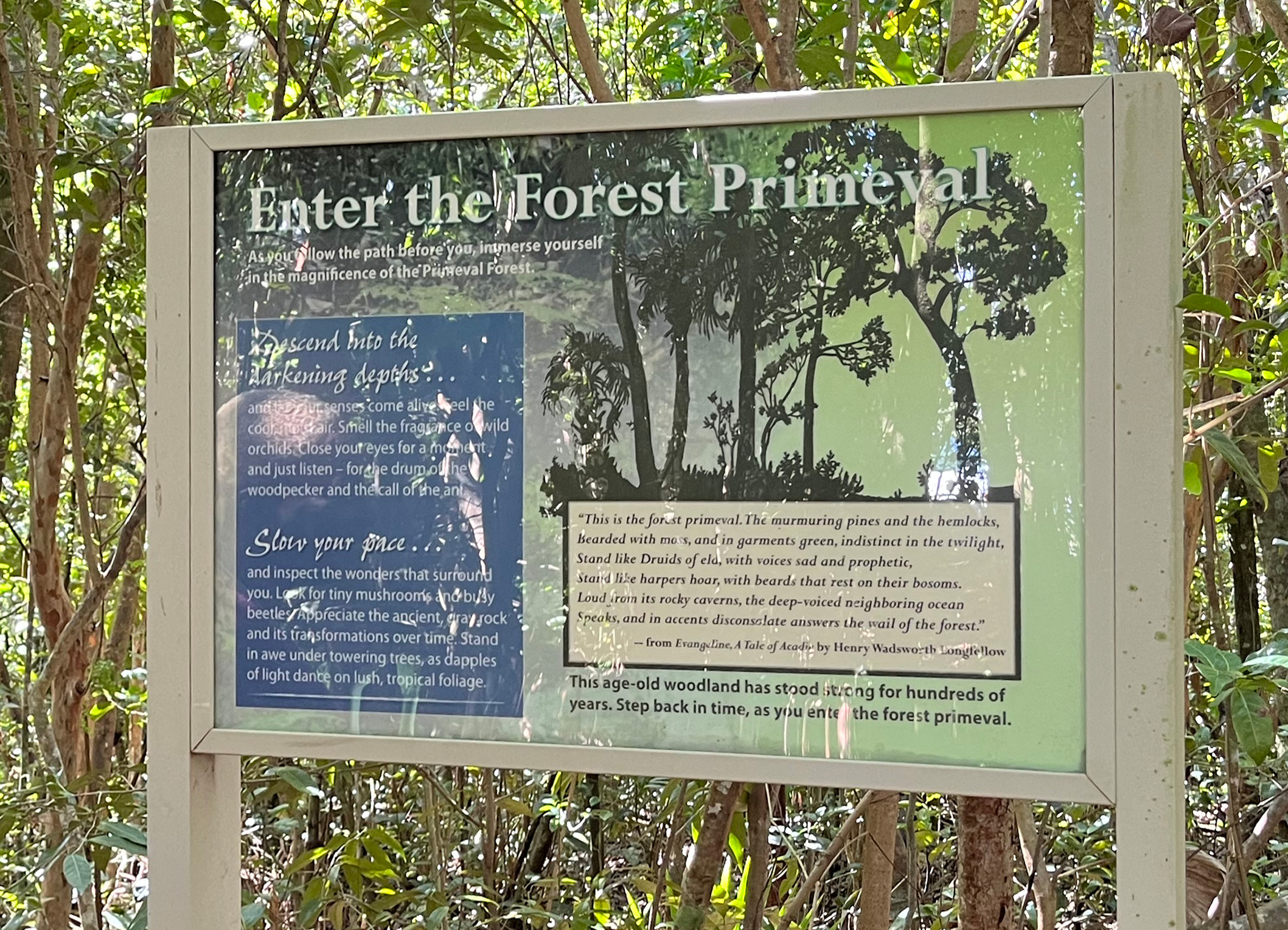
- Interactive map of Primeval Forest National Park
- Location: New Providence, The Bahamas
- Nearest city: Nassau
- Coordinates: 25°00′50″N 77°31′01″W
- Area: 7.5 acres (0 km^{2})
- Established: 2002
- Governing body: Bahamas National Trust
- Website: bnt.bs/primeval-forest-national-park/

Primeval Forest National Park is a small national park located on southwestern New Providence Island in The Bahamas. A patch of old-growth blackland coppice and karst with an area of 7.5 acres, it is considered a time capsule of the old evergreen tropical hardwood forests of The Bahamas. It was established in 2002.

== History ==
From the 18th century into the 1970s, the logging industry led to the mass culling of hardwood forests that used to cover the islands and could be as tall as 50 ft. In the 1990s, then president of The Bahamas National Trust Pericles Maillis came across a remaining undisturbed patch of ancient forest, and led an initiative to protect the area.

== Nature ==
The park can be viewed from wooden boardwalks, steps, and bridges. The main attraction of the park is arguably the limestone caverns and sinkholes. Flora includes pines, hemlocks, and mosses and fauna includes a number of bird species.
