= West Side National Park =

National park

- Location within Bahamas
- Location: Andros, the Bahamas
- Nearest city: Nassau
- Coordinates: 24.28°N 77.95°W
- Area: 1,500,000 acres (6,070 km^{2})
- Established: 2002
- Governing body: Bahamas National Trust
- Website: bnt.bs/explore/andros/west-side-national-park/

West Side National Park is a national park covering the western half of Andros, the Bahamas, and the surrounding waters. The park was established in 2002 and, after being expanded in 2012, has an area of 1,500,000 acres (6,070 km^{2}), being one of the largest protected areas in the region. The park is regarded as a marine protected area, which includes tidal creeks and coastal mangrove forest, as well as an expansive coastal zone.

== Flora and fauna ==
Inland, the park contains areas of Caribbean pine, which provide habitat for atala butterflies. The mangrove areas include red, white and black mangroves, and buttonwood. The park provides an important feeding area for the West Indian flamingo. The Andros rock iguana is found on land, along with the Bahamian boa constrictor, Cuban twig anole, Bahama brown anole, Bahama green anole, blue-tail lizard, curly-tailed lizard, and Cuban tree frog. Hawksbill and green sea turtles are found throughout the park, and loggerhead turtles inhabit the northern part of the park. Conch, lobster, bonefish, Atlantic tarpon, the nurse shark, the bull shark and the smalltooth sawfish are found in the coastal waters.
