= Abaco National Park =

National park in South Abaco, the Bahamas

- Location within Bahamas
- Location: South Abaco, the Bahamas
- Coordinates: 25.966°N 77.203°W
- Area: 20,500 acres (83 km^{2})
- Established: 9 May 1994
- Governing body: Bahamas National Trust
- Website: bnt.bs/abaco-national-park/

Abaco National Park is a national park in South Abaco, the Abaco Islands, the Bahamas. The park was established in 1994 and has an area of 20,500 acres (83 km^{2}).

== Flora and fauna ==
The park contains 5,000 acres (20 km^{2}) of pine forest; Caribbean pine. Avian wildlife at the park includes the Bahama parrot, Bahama swallow, Bahama yellowthroat, Bahama mockingbird, loggerhead kingbird, olive-capped warbler, West Indian woodpecker and the white-crowned pigeon.
