= Inagua National Park =

National park on the island of Great Inagua in The Bahamas

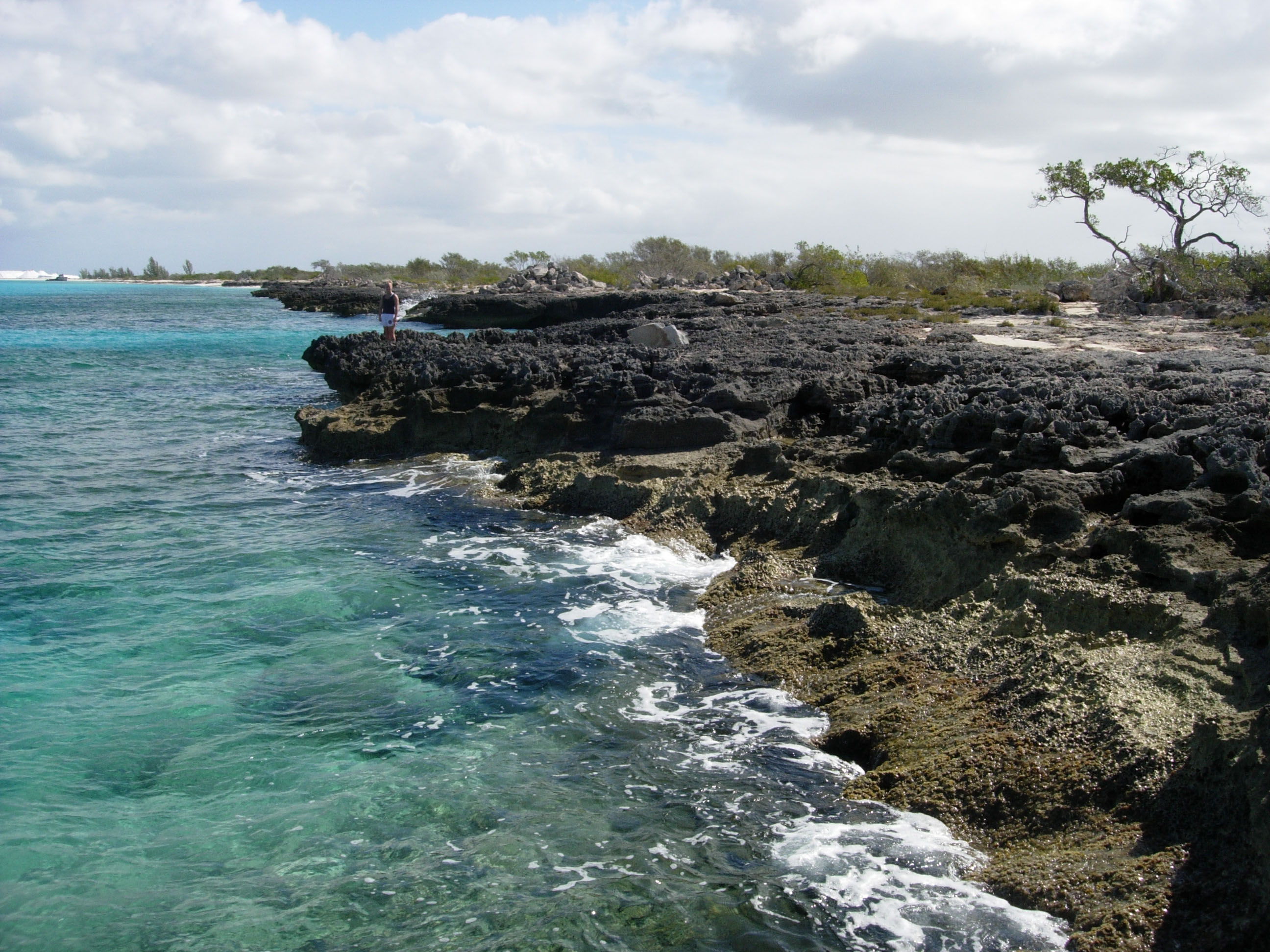
- North shore of Great Inagua

- Location within Bahamas
- Location: Great Inagua, The Bahamas
- Coordinates: 21.082°N 73.372°W
- Area: 220,000 acres (890 km^{2})
- Established: 1965
- Governing body: Bahamas National Trust
- Website: bnt.bs/inagua-national-park/

Ramsar Wetland
- Designated: 7 February 1999
- Reference no.: 892

Inagua National Park is a national park on the island of Great Inagua in The Bahamas. It was established in 1965 and has an area of 220,000 acres (890 km^{2}).

From as far back as 1904 there was rising concern about the West Indian flamingo populations. During the 1960s, the Bahamas National Trust formed the Inagua National Park, which is where the world's largest breeding colony of West Indian flamingoes can be found. Forty years ago this flamingo species made a comeback from the brink of extinction to a colony of over 50,000 birds. The park has contributed to increasing bird populations in nearby islands such as Mayaguana, Acklins, Crooked Island, Cuba, and Andros. In 1997 the park was designated a wetland of international importance. It is also known as a bird watchers' paradise as it was designated an Important Bird Area.

The park encloses all of Lake Rosa, the largest salt-water lake in the Bahamas.
