= Thomas Winer Malone =

Bahamian wooden boat builder

- Born: November 1, 1929; Hope Town, Elbow Cay, Bahamas
- Died: January 22, 2018 (aged 88)
- Other names: Winer Malone
- Known for: Prominent Bahamian boat builder, having built more than 200 Abaco dinghies
- Spouse: Joanne Malone (m. 1962)
- Children: 3

Thomas Winer Malone (November 1, 1929 – January 22, 2018) was a Bahamian wooden boat builder who single-handedly crafted over 200 dinghies in his lifetime. Ranging 10–14 ft (3.0–4.3 m), his boats were hewn from memory without the use of power tools, jigs, or templates. Malone used wood from trees he cut himself on the Abaco Islands.

Malone's Abaco dinghy is open-hulled and single-masted with a small "banana board" supporting the top of the sail.

Before the advent of outboard motors in the 1950s, Bahamian dinghies often provided the sole means of transportation for fishermen, farmers, and visiting families, as well as the occasional smuggler (or rum runner).

== Additional references ==
- Baker, Christopher P. (2001). Bahamas, Turks & Caicos. Footscray, VIC: Lonely Planet Publications Pty Ltd. ISBN 9781864501995.
