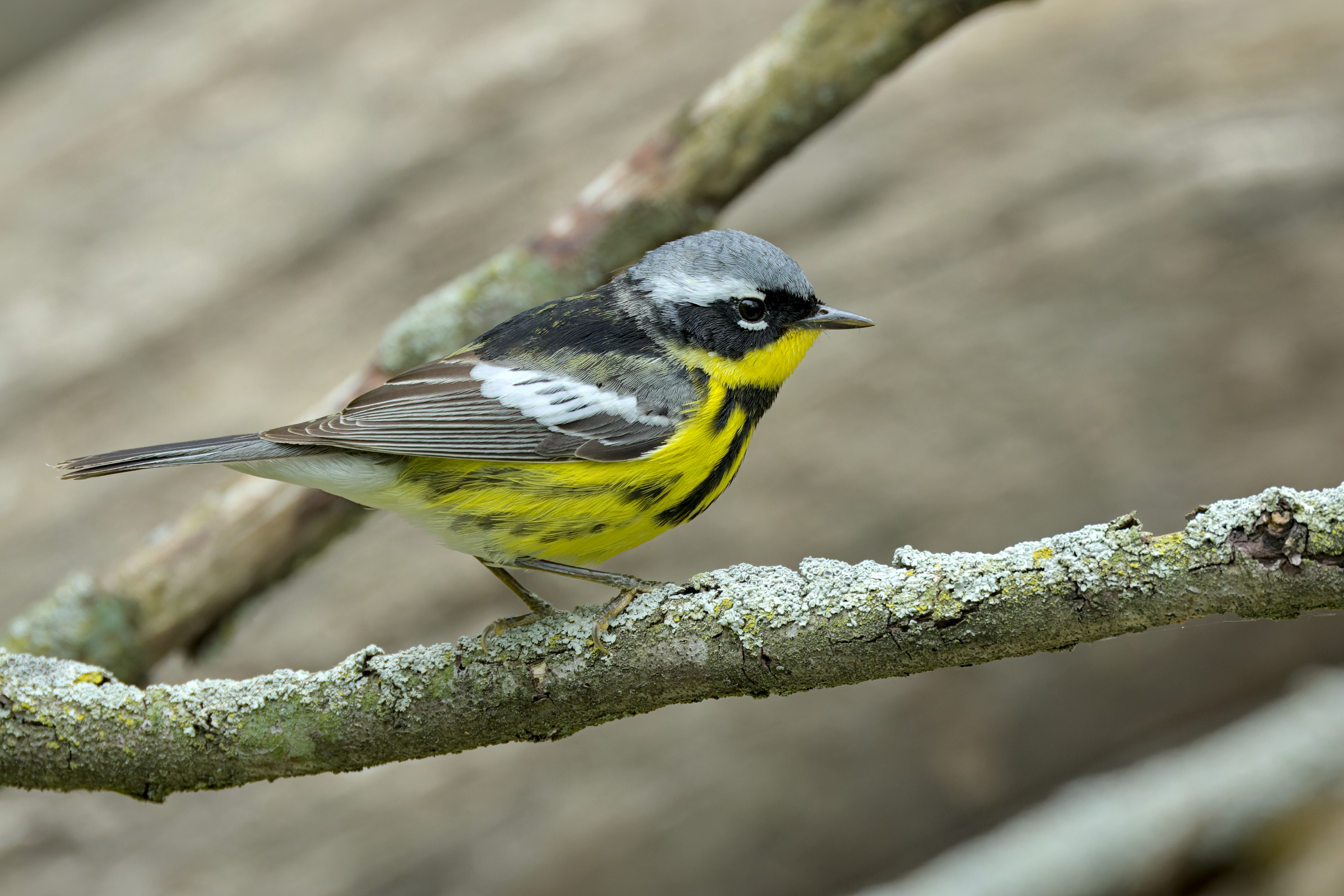
- An adult male in Chicago, Illinois
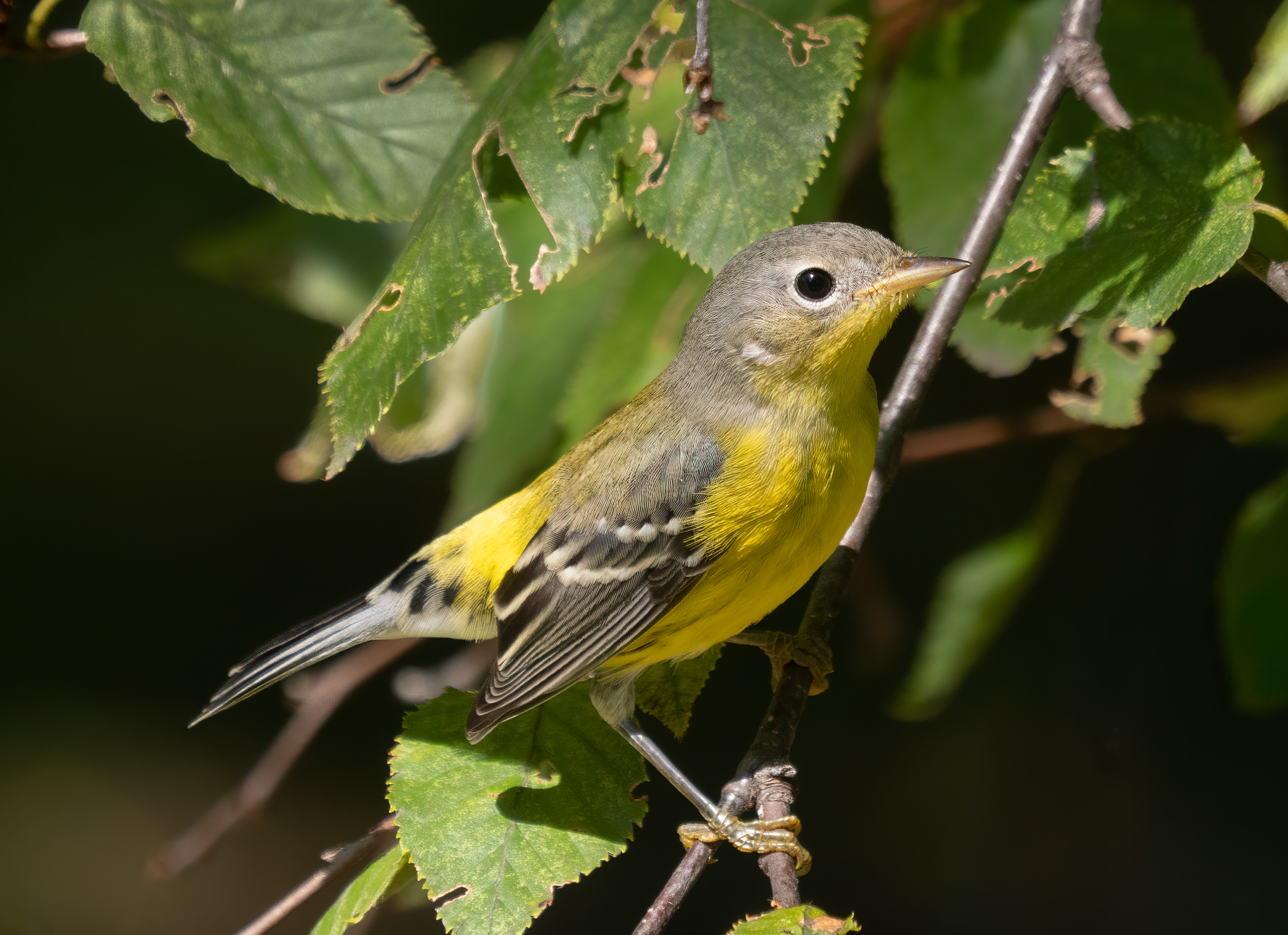
- Female/immature male in New York

Conservation status
- Least Concern (IUCN 3.1)

Scientific classification
- Kingdom: Animalia
- Phylum: Chordata
- Class: Aves
- Order: Passeriformes
- Family: Parulidae
- Genus: Setophaga
- Species: S. magnolia

Binomial name
- Setophaga magnolia (Wilson, 1811)
- Range of the S. magnolia Breeding range Wintering range

Synonyms
- Dendroica magnolia Dendroica maculosa

= Magnolia warbler =

Species of bird

The magnolia warbler (Setophaga magnolia) is a member of the wood warbler family Parulidae.

== Etymology ==
The genus name Setophaga is from Ancient Greek ses, "moth", and phagos, "eating", and the specific magnolia refers to the type locality. American ornithologist Alexander Wilson found this species in magnolias near Fort Adams, Mississippi.

== Description ==
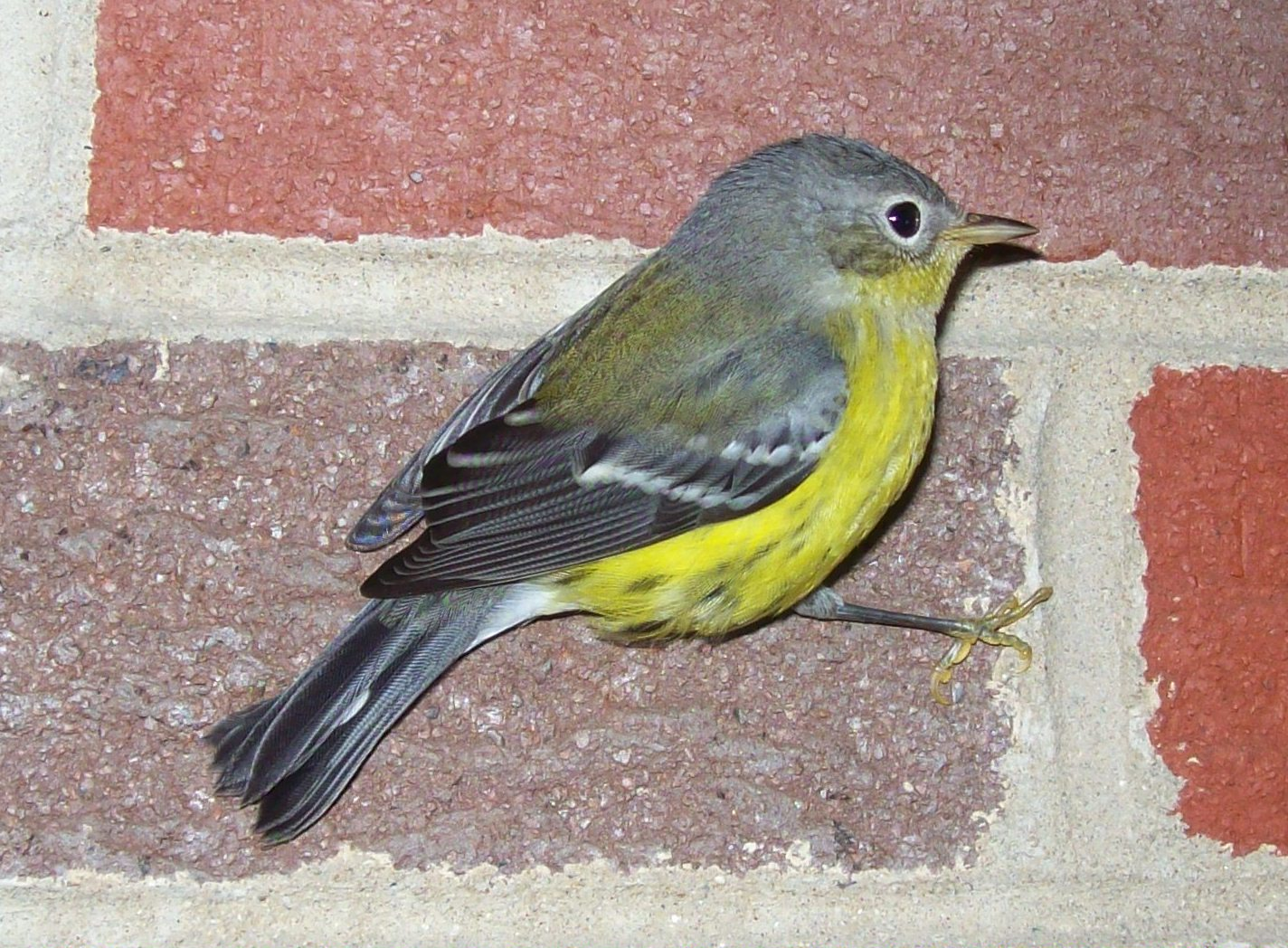
First-year male magnolia warbler

This species is a moderately small New World warbler. It measures 11 to 13 cm (4.3 to 5.1 in) in length and spans 16 to 20 cm (6.3 to 7.9 in) across the wings. Body mass in adult birds can range from 6.6 to 12.6 g (0.23 to 0.44 oz), though weights have reportedly ranged up to 15 g (0.53 oz) prior to migration. Among standard measurements, the wing chord is 5.4 to 6.4 cm (2.1 to 2.5 in), the tail is 4.6 to 5.2 cm (1.8 to 2.0 in), the bill is 0.8 to 1 cm (0.31 to 0.39 in) and the tarsus is 1.7 to 1.85 cm (0.67 to 0.73 in). The magnolia warbler can be distinguished by its coloration. The breeding males often have white, gray, and black backs with yellow on the sides; yellow and black-striped stomachs; white, gray, and black foreheads and beaks; distinct black tails with white stripes on the underside; and defined white patches on their wings, called wing bars. Breeding females usually have the same type of coloration as the males, except that their colors are much duller. Immature warblers also resemble the same dull coloration of the females. The yellow and black-striped stomachs help one to distinguish the males from other similar birds, like the prairie warbler and Kirtland's warbler (which, however, have a breeding range to the south and east of the magnolia warbler's).

== Distribution and habitat ==
The magnolia warbler breeds in the boreal forests of northern portions of the Great Lakes, New England, and Appalachian regions of the United States, as well as across large parts of central and eastern Canada. The warbler breeds in dense forests, where it will most likely be found among the branches of young, densely packed, coniferous trees.

During the winter, the warbler migrates through the eastern and central half of the United States, as far west as Oklahoma and Kansas to reach its wintering grounds in southern Mexico, Central America, and the Caribbean. During migration season, the magnolia warbler can be found in various types of woodlands.

== Life cycle ==
The magnolia warbler undergoes multiple molts during its lifetime. The first molts begin while the young offspring are still living in the nest, while the rest take place on or near their breeding grounds. The warblers molt, breed, care for their offspring, and then migrate. Chicks hatch after a two-week incubation period, and can fledge from the nest after close to another two weeks when their feathers are more developed. After about a month, the chicks can leave the nest to begin living (and later breeding) on their own since they are solitary birds. Magnolia warblers typically live up to seven years.

== Hybridization ==
Rare hybrids between the magnolia warbler and the congeneric American redstart (Setophaga ruticilla) have been documented on two occasions, in Ohio, USA, and Quebec, Canada. In both cases, the hybrid's mother was a magnolia warbler and the father was a redstart.

== Behavior ==
=== Diet and feeding ===
This warbler usually eats any type of arthropod, but their main delicacies are caterpillars. The warbler also feeds on different types of beetles, butterflies, spiders, and fruit during their breeding season, while they increase their intake of both fruit and nectar during the winter. These birds also tend to eat parts of the branches of mid-height coniferous trees, such as spruce firs, in their usual breeding habitat.

=== Songs ===
Magnolia warbler song recorded in Minnesota in late May

Researchers have observed two different types of songs in male magnolia warblers. Their songs have been referred to as the First Category song and the Second Category song. These songs have two distinct purposes – one used to attract mates, and the other to defend territory. Females, while they do sing, have not been observed to have separate songs for different situations. Both males and females have call notes that they use for various alerts: the females have short call notes to signal when a human observer is watching them, and the males have short call notes to signal when any sort of threatening predators are close to their offspring.

=== Reproduction ===
Male magnolia warblers go to their breeding grounds about two weeks before the females arrive. After the females come to the breeding grounds, both the males and females cooperate to build the nest for a week. Because of the difficulty of locating their nests among the forest's dense undergrowth, it is hard to know whether the warblers re-use their original nests each breeding season, or whether they abandon them for new ones. The nests are built in their tree of choice – different types of fir trees, such as Abies balsamea (balsam fir) and Picea glauca (spruce fir). The nest is made up of grass, twigs, and horsehair fungus, and they are relatively small, shallow, circular-shaped nests, barely exceeding 10 cm on all sides. The nests are usually found close to the ground, commonly in the lowest three meters of the firs.

Female magnolia warblers usually lay three to five eggs during each breeding season. The female will not incubate her eggs until all of them are laid. The female sits on the eggs for about two weeks before the eggs hatch. The female is also the one that warms the newborn chicks by brooding, or sitting, on the nest; she is also the one who feeds the newborn chicks most frequently, though the males also engage in feeding the offspring at times. Because the males are technically as equally responsible for feeding the newborns as the females are, this means that the males are monogamous because they expend a large amount of energy looking for food for their young. In order to keep the nest clean, females eat the fecal sacs of their newborns; as the chicks grow older, both parents simply remove the sacs from the nest. The baby warblers are ready to fly out of the nest by the time they are ten days old.

== Conservation ==
The magnolia warbler is assessed on the IUCN Red List as least concern for conservation because it is fairly widespread and common within its habitat and not at risk of extinction. Research has shown that a good percentage of warblers die from flying into television towers in their migratory path. Also, parts of their habitat have been degraded as coniferous forests are cleared which causes the number of warblers living in a habitat to decrease, but they certainly are not greatly affected by the deforestation. While the deforestation does decrease the warbler population in the specific area that it occurs in, the species is not significantly impacted overall due to the general abundance of the species throughout the region.

== In art ==
John James Audubon's Black & Yellow Warbler (magnolia warbler), Plate 123 from The Birds of America

John James Audubon illustrated the magnolia warbler in The Birds of America, Second Edition (published, London 1827–38) as Plate 123 under the title, "Black & Yellow Warbler – Sylvia maculosa" where a pair of birds (male and female) are shown searching flowering raspberry for insects. The image was engraved and colored by Robert Havell's London workshops. The original watercolor by Audubon was purchased by The New York Historical.
