= Fowl Cays National Park =

National park in the Bahamas

- Location within Bahamas
- Location: Central Abaco, the Bahamas
- Coordinates: 26.6296°N 77.0416°W
- Area: 2,335 acres (9 km^{2})
- Established: 2009
- Governing body: Bahamas National Trust
- Website: bnt.bs/fowl-cays-national-park/

Fowl Cays National Park is a national park in Central Abaco, the Bahamas, situated between Scotland Cay and Man-O-War Cay. The park was established in 2009 and has an area of 2,335 acres (9 km^{2}).

== Flora and fauna ==
The park contains coral reef systems and seagrass bed, which provide habitat for surgeonfish, grunts and parrotfish. In 2017, a staghorn coral nursery was established in the park.

== Environmental incident ==
In March 2024, a barge and tugboat operated by subcontractors working for the Bakers Bay Golf & Ocean Club ran aground on the reef crest within Fowl Cays National Park during rough seas. The vessels were transporting construction materials to Bakers Bay Golf & Ocean Club when they became stranded atop live coral reef, within the park’s protected marine zone. Despite early warnings from local conservationists and dive operators, the vessels remained lodged on the reef as of May 2025, causing significant damage to coral and seagrass habitat. The incident drew criticism from Bahamian environmental groups and international marine science organizations, who called for urgent removal of the wreck and greater accountability for private developments operating in or near marine protected areas. By early 2025, no official explanation had been provided for the delay, and the wreckage remained in place. Meanwhile, the subcontracting firms involved in the incident entered into a legal dispute, with one party filing a $5 million lawsuit over responsibility for the grounding.
