= Green Turtle Cay =

Barrier island off Great Abaco, The Bahamas

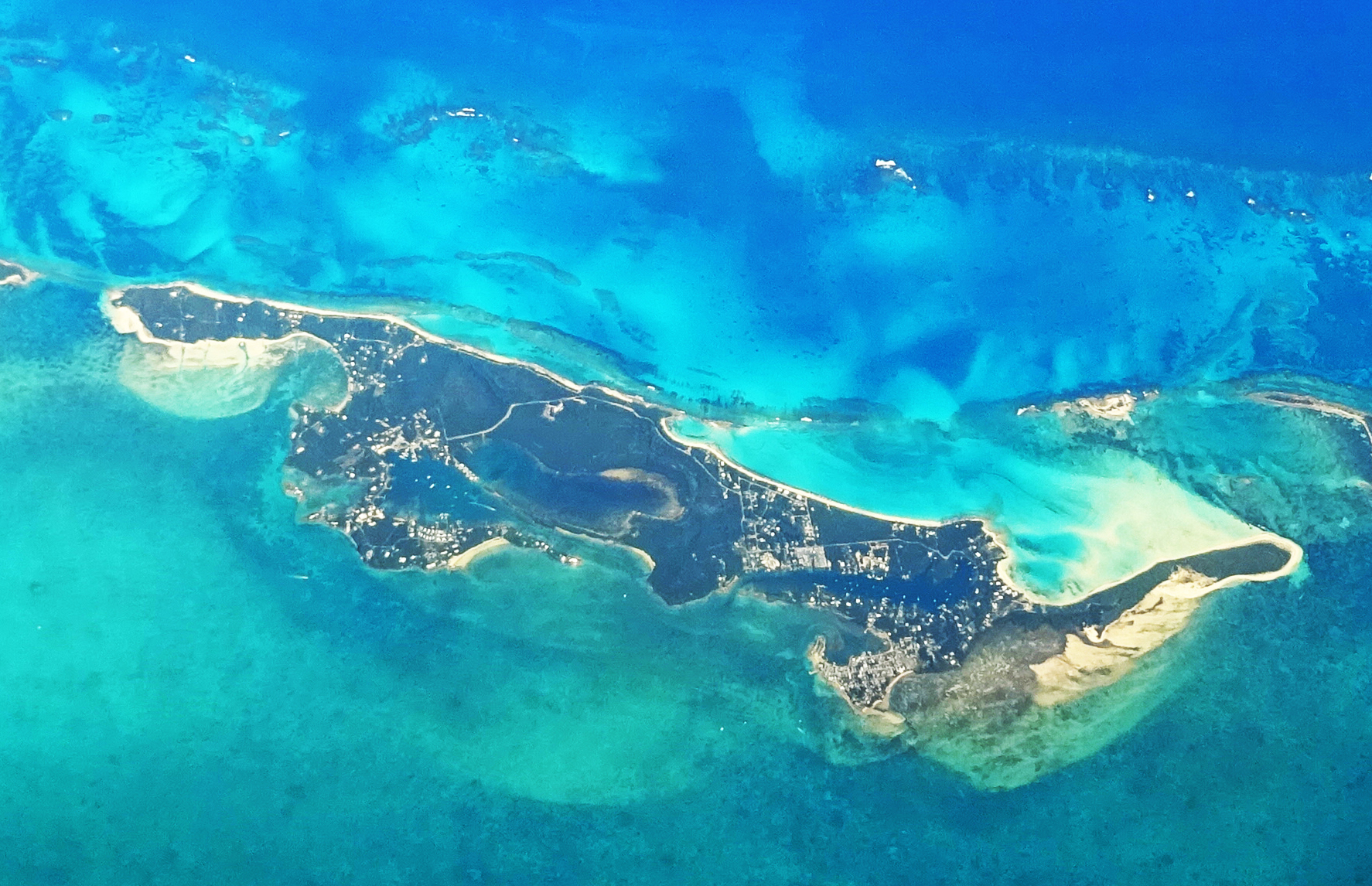
- Green Turtle Cay from aeroplane

- The location of Green Turtle Cay within the Bahamas

- Location within Bahamas

Geography
- Location: Atlantic Ocean
- Coordinates: 26°46′N 77°19′W
- Type: Cay
- Archipelago: Lucayan Archipelago

Administration
- Bahamas

Additional information
- Time zone: EST (UTC-5)
  - Summer (DST): EDT (UTC-4)
- ISO code: BS-NO

Green Turtle Cay is one of the barrier islands off mainland Great Abaco, The Bahamas. It can only be reached via ferry from the mainland or boat. There is not an airport on the island. It is considered part of the "Abaco Out Islands" and is 3 miles (4.8 km) long and ½ mile wide. It was named after the once abundant green turtles that inhabited the area. In 1977, Key West, Florida became a sister city to New Plymouth, Green Turtle Cay's village.

The population of the island is about 450 and its main settlement is New Plymouth which was founded in the 18th century. The architecture of the older homes in the village is unique in the Bahamas, with steep-pitched roofs, originating with settlers from New England. New Plymouth contains a post office, a bank, a customs and immigration office, four grocery stores, several restaurants, bars, and churches and there is a museum featuring the paintings of noted Bahamian painter Alton Lowe. New Plymouth also features the "Loyalist Memorial Sculpture Garden," a Bahamian National Monument featuring 24 busts of prominent Bahamians arranged around a central pair of life-sized bronze figures of both black and white loyalist women, sculpted by James Mastin. The village can be walked in less than 15 minutes end to end. While cars are allowed on the island, golf carts and bicycles are the usual mode of transport. Both are easily rented for those visiting the island.

Green Turtle Cay is known for its beaches and has several full-service hotel-resorts with boat marinas. These are Bluff House and the Green Turtle Club. There is also a boat repair yard with haul-out slips. Green Turtle Cay is a stopover-point for southbound vessels during periods of rough seas in the Whale Cay Passage. Lobstering and tourism are the main industries of the island today. In August 2019, Green Turtle Cay and the rest of the Abacos were struck by Hurricane Dorian. The storm was a Category 5 Hurricane and was the most deadly storm to hit the area. There have been 17 reported casualties in the Abacos, but none on Green Turtle Cay.
