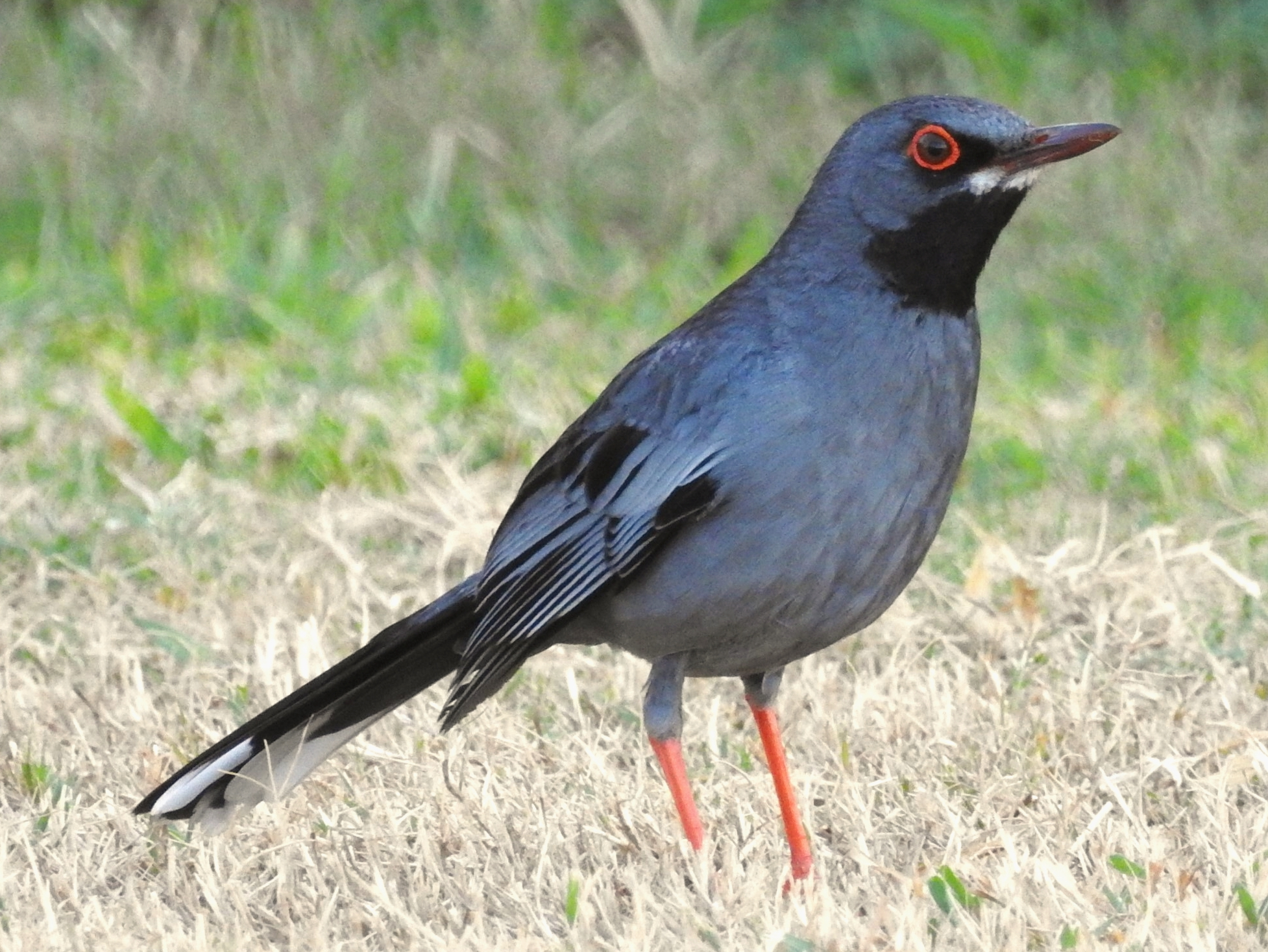
- nominate T. p. plumbeus in Grand Bahama
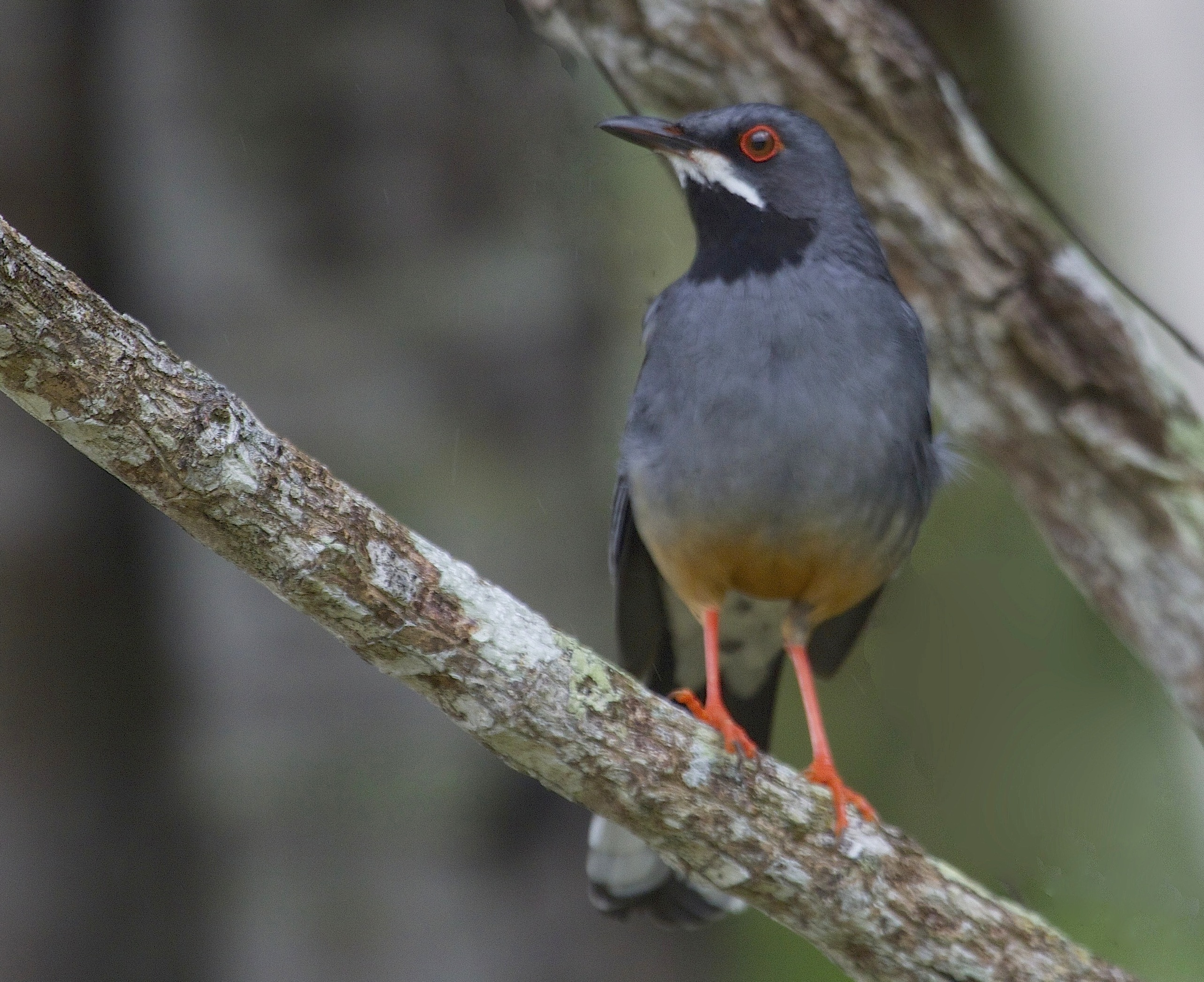
- T. p. rubripes in Cuba

Conservation status
- Least Concern (IUCN 3.1)

Scientific classification
- Kingdom: Animalia
- Phylum: Chordata
- Class: Aves
- Order: Passeriformes
- Family: Turdidae
- Genus: Turdus
- Species: T. plumbeus

Binomial name
- Turdus plumbeus Linnaeus, 1758

= Western red-legged thrush =

Species of bird

The Western red-legged thrush (Turdus plumbeus) is a species of bird in the family Turdidae. Native to the Caribbean, it is found in the Bahamas, Cayman Islands, and Cuba. It formerly occurred on the Swan Islands, Honduras, but was extirpated there.

== Taxonomy ==
The red-legged thrush was formally described by the Swedish naturalist Carl Linnaeus in 1758 in the tenth edition of his Systema Naturae under its current binomial name Turdus plumbeus. Linnaeus based his account of the "red leg'd thrush" that had been described and illustrated by the English naturalist Mark Catesby in his book The Natural History of Carolina, Florida and the Bahama Islands. The specific epithet is Latin meaning "leaden", "plumbeous" or "lead-coloured". It was formerly considered conspecific with the eastern red-legged thrush but in 2025 the species was split in two by AviList and Clements checklist based on differences in plumage and genetics.

Four subspecies are recognised:

- T. p. plumbeus – Linnaeus, 1758: nominate; found on the northern Bahamas islands.
- T. p. schistaceus – (Baird, S.F., 1864): found in eastern Cuba. Has beige-orange color on rear flanks and vent area. Bill is dark red with dusky tip.
- T. p. rubripes – Temminck, 1826: found in central and western Cuba and on Isla de la Juventud. Has more white in throat and malar area. It also has orange lower flanks, belly and vent.
- T. p. coryi – (Sharpe, 1902): found on the Cayman Islands. Paler and with less orange on underparts than T. p. rubripes.

== Description ==
The western red-legged thrush is mainly slaty above with an either pale or rufous belly depending on the subspecies and a variably white and black throat. The legs, bill and eye ring are bright orange-red. There is notable variation in plumage between the subspecies.

== Habitat ==
Its natural habitats are subtropical or tropical dry forests, subtropical or tropical moist lowland forests, subtropical or tropical moist montane forests, and heavily degraded former forest. This species may be considered the Caribbean counterpart of the American robin, as it has similar habits, including being a common visitor to gardens and lawns.

== Diet ==
Its food is mostly fruits, but a third of its diet is animal matter: insects (caterpillars, beetles, ants, crickets, wasps), plus occasional snails, frogs, lizards and birds' eggs.
