= Bahamas National Trust =

Bahamian conservation organization

- Abbreviation: BNT
- Formation: 1959; 67 years ago
- Location(s): Island Traders Building; East Bay Street; Nassau, Bahamas
- Website: bnt.bs

The Bahamas National Trust is a non-profit organisation in the Bahamas that manages the country's 32 national parks. Its headquarters is located on the 2nd floor of the Island Traders Building Suites, East Bay Street in Nassau. Its office was formally located at The Retreat Gardens on Village Road. The Bahamas National Trust was created by an Act of Parliament in 1959, through the efforts of two groups of conservationists.

== History ==
=== Flamingos ===
In the early 20th century there was concern for the survival of the Caribbean flamingo. The National Audubon Society of the United States urged the Bahamas government to protect the flamingos, which led to passage of the Wildbirds (Protection) Act in 1905.

In the early 1950s, Audubon expert Robert Porter Allen scoured the Caribbean searching for flamingos. In his popular book, On the Trail of Vanishing Birds, Allen found that the colonies on the island of Andros in the Bahamas had already disappeared. He determined that the largest surviving group of Caribbean flamingos inhabited the isolated back-waters of Lake Rosa on Inagua. That is where Allen and the Audubon Society decided to make a stand. A group of influential backers was recruited in Nassau to form a Society for the Protection of the Flamingo, with Arthur Vernay as its leader. Two wardens were hired on Inagua, brothers Samuel and James Nixon, and Audubon helped finance the entire operation.

=== Exuma cays ===
Explorer Ilia Tolstoy (also known as Ilya Andreyevich Tolstoy, grandson of the 19th century Russian writer and a frequent visitor to the Bahamas) had been lobbying the colonial government to set aside some Bahamian islands as protected areas. In 1957 the government agreed to temporarily reserve a 22-mile (35 km) stretch of the Exuma cays, providing that some group would explore the possibility of creating a national park and make concrete recommendations. Meanwhile, Columbia University graduate Carleton Ray had written a book on The Bahamas called The Underwater Guide to Marine Life, which recommended the protection of marine areas in the same way that land areas were protected. Ray teamed up with Tolstoy to mount a new Bahamian expedition, to the Exuma cays, which was organised by January 1958. Allen and other well-known conservationists, including Donald Squires of the American Museum of Natural History and Bahamian experts Oris Russell and Herbert McKinney, were part of the team. They spent a week travelling by boat from Norman's Cay to Conch Cut and their report led to the creation of the world's first land and sea park in the Exumas, as well as to the formation of the Bahamas National Trust itself.

They concluded that the area had "essentially unspoiled natural conditions with unmodified associations of plants, animals, earth processes, and those intangible elements that combine to give an area its outstanding character", and that "the Exuma Cays park under consideration should be regarded as only the beginning of a conservation movement that is vital to the Bahamas as a whole. It will also be a beginning of a new concept, integrated land-and-sea conservation, in which the Bahamas will take the lead and show the way to other nations throughout the world."

The survey team called for an organisation modelled on the British National Trust to acquire lands and manage protected areas throughout the Bahamas. This organisation - which was created by parliament in 1959 - would be the government's advisor on conservation matters and seek to educate Bahamians on the value of their natural heritage. The government adopted the expedition's recommendations wholesale and the 176-square-mile (460 km^{2}) Exuma Cays Land and Sea Park, the first of its kind in the world, was officially established, and The Bahamas National Trust was created as an independent statutory organization charged with conservation and preservation.

The BNTs governing council includes government, private sector and scientific representatives. In addition to overseeing the Exuma Cays Land and Sea Park, The Bahamas National Trust also took over responsibility for the endangered flamingos on Inagua. Over the years since the BNT has built a national parks system that incorporates 25 protected areas totalling over 700,000 acres (2,833 km^{2}) on land and in the sea.

== List of national parks in the Bahamas ==
The Bahamas national park system protects many unique features, critical habitats and endangered species. Highlights include the world's largest breeding colony of Caribbean flamingos, miles of underwater cave systems and the first no-take marine reserves in the wider Caribbean.

Abaco

- Abaco National Park
- Black Sound Cay National Reserve
- Fowl Cays National Park
- Pelican Cays Land and Sea Park
- Tilloo Cay National Reserve
- Walker's Cay National Park

Andros

- Blue Holes National Park
- Crab Replenishment Reserve
- North and South Marine Parks
- West Side National Park

Conception Island

- Conception Island National Park

Crooked Island

- Hope Great House
- Marine Farm

Eleuthera

- Leon Levy Native Plant Preserve

Exuma

- Exuma Cays Land and Sea Park
- Moriah Harbour Cay National Park

Grand Bahama

- Lucayan National Park
- Peterson Cay National Park
- Rand Nature Centre

Inagua

- Inagua National Park
- Little Inagua National Park
- Union Creek Reserve

New Providence

- Bonefish Pond National Park
- Harrold and Wilson Ponds National Park
- Primeval Forest National Park
- The Retreat
