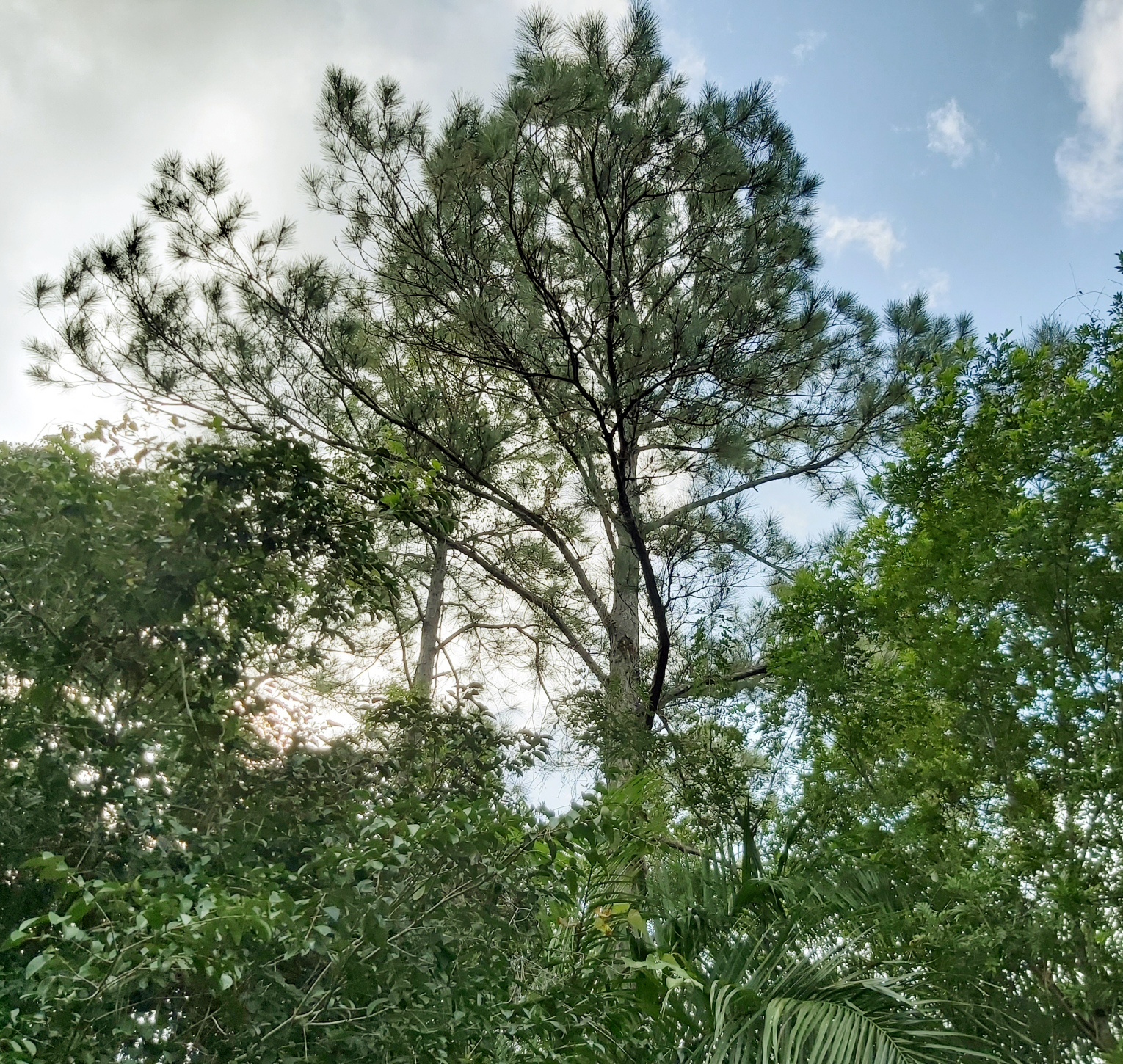
- Pinus caribaea var. caribaea, Pinar del Río, Cuba

Conservation status
- Least Concern (IUCN 3.1)

Scientific classification
- Kingdom: Plantae
- Clade: Tracheophytes
- Clade: Gymnosperms
- Division: Pinophyta
- Class: Pinopsida
- Order: Pinales
- Family: Pinaceae
- Genus: Pinus
- Subgenus: P. subg. Pinus
- Section: P. sect. Trifoliae
- Subsection: P. subsect. Australes
- Species: P. caribaea

Binomial name
- Pinus caribaea Morelet

Varieties
- Pinus caribaea var. bahamensis (Griseb.) W.H.Barrett & Golfari; Pinus caribaea var. caribaea; Pinus caribaea var. hondurensis (Sénécl.) W.H.Barrett & Golfari
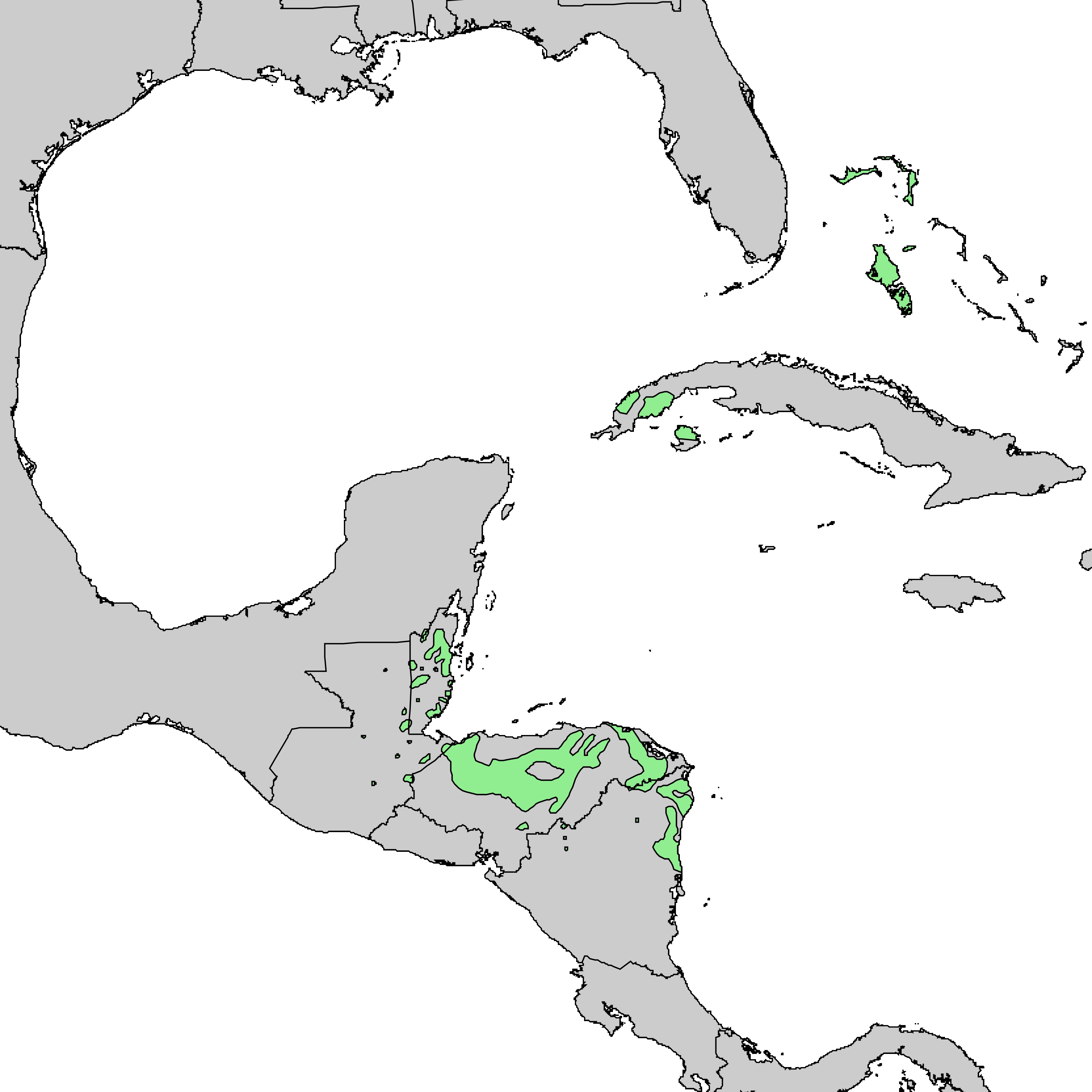
- Natural range of Pinus caribaea

Synonyms
- Pinus hondurensis Sénéclauze (but see text)

= Caribbean pine =

Species of conifer

The Caribbean pine (Pinus caribaea) is a species of conifer in the family Pinaceae, a hard pine species native to Central America, southeastern Mexico, and the northern West Indies (in Cuba, the Bahamas, and the Turks and Caicos Islands). It belongs to subsection Australes in subgenus Pinus. It inhabits tropical and subtropical coniferous forests such as Bahamian pineyards, in both lowland savannas and montane forests.

== Taxonomy ==
As of 2026, the species has three accepted varieties:

- Pinus caribaea var. caribaea – Caribbean pine, pino macho, pitch pine (Pinar del Río Province and Isla de la Juventud in western Cuba)
- Pinus caribaea var. bahamensis (Grisebach) W.H.Barrett & Golfari – Bahamas pine, Caicos pine (The Bahamas, Turks and Caicos Islands)
- Pinus caribaea var. hondurensis (Sénéclauze) W.H.Barrett & Golfari – Honduras pine, Nicaragua pine (states of Quintana Roo and the Yucatán in Mexico, Belize, Guatemala, El Salvador, Honduras, Nicaragua). Treated a separate species, Pinus hondurensis Sénéclauze, by some authors. It differs markedly from vars. caribaea and bahamensis in having larger cones with a prominent transverse ridge on the apophyses and stouter spike-like umbo (rather than small prickles), and in the seedlings retaining glaucous single juvenile leaves for nine months to a year or more, as opposed to three to four months in the other two varieties. The seedling growth rate is also significantly faster.

== Distribution ==
It has been proposed that the pines of Australes subsection (of which Caribbean pine is part) arrived to the Caribbean basin from the southeastern United States. Regarding the population in the Bahamas, it has been proposed that this species emigrated into the region from Florida four or five thousand years ago, long after the end of the Ice Age, as the climate became wetter. Based on fossil species assemblages it is believed that the environment on the Bahamas was much less forested and a dry savannah during the glacial maximum some 18,000 years ago when the sea level was some 120 metres (390 feet) lower than it is today.

Paleoclimatic and genetic data have been used to propose that P. caribaea ultimately originated in Central America. According to chloroplast genetic data, P. caribaea lineages colonized the Caribbean islands from populations in Central America at least twice (one leading to Cuban populations and another leading to the populations on the Bahamas).

Fossils are known from the Pleistocene of Florida.

== Ecology ==
Periodic wildfires play a major role in the distribution of this species; this tree regenerates quickly and aggressively, replacing broadleaf trees after fires. In zones without fires, the succession continues and the pine forest is replaced by tropical broadleaf forest. The young pines require bright sunlight to grow, and are resistant to fire once they mature.

== Conservation ==
According to the International Union for Conservation of Nature, this species as a whole is considered of least concern, but two of the three varieties are considered endangered (var. caribaea) or vulnerable (var. bahamensis).

== Uses ==
Lumber and pulpwood from this tree shipped to Florida is the main export of the Abaco Islands.

The Uverito forest in Venezuela, located between the states of Anzoátegui and Monagas, is the largest artificial forest in the world planted by man, with around 600,000 hectares (1,500,000 acres) of Caribbean pine forest plantations.
