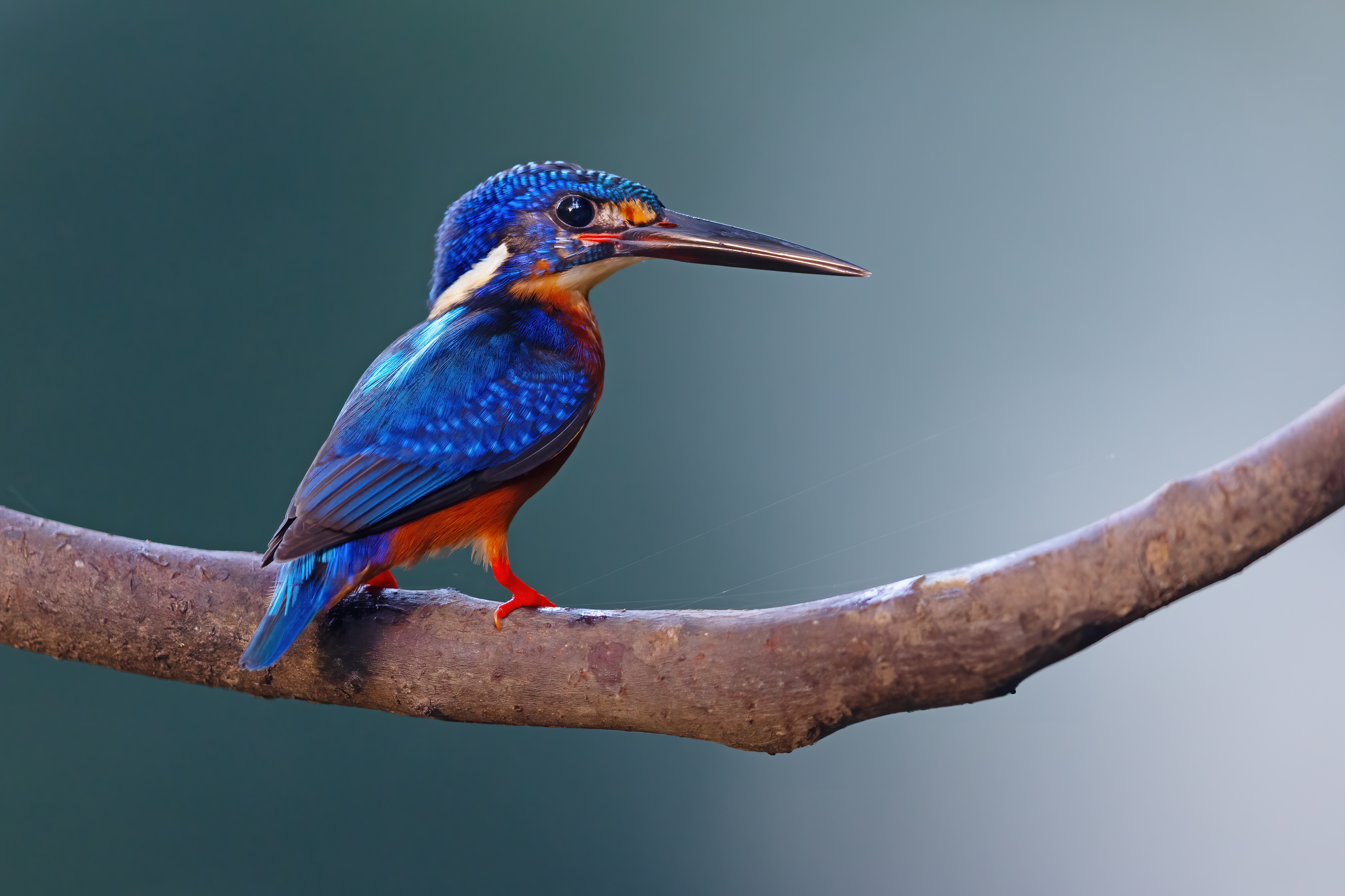

Conservation status
- Least Concern (IUCN 3.1)

Scientific classification
- Kingdom: Animalia
- Phylum: Chordata
- Class: Aves
- Order: Coraciiformes
- Family: Alcedinidae
- Subfamily: Alcedininae
- Genus: Alcedo
- Species: A. meninting

Binomial name
- Alcedo meninting Horsfield, 1821

= Blue-eared kingfisher =

Species of bird

The blue-eared kingfisher (Alcedo meninting) is found in Asia, ranging across the Indian subcontinent and Southeast Asia. It is found mainly in dense shaded forests where it hunts in small streams. It is darker crowned, with darker rufous underparts and lacking the rufous ear stripe of the common kingfisher (Alcedo atthis) which is found in more open habitats. A number of subspecies have been described that differ in measurement and colour shade. Adult males have an all dark bill while females have a reddish lower mandible.

== Taxonomy ==
The blue-eared kingfisher was described by the American naturalist Thomas Horsfield in 1821 and given its current binomial name Alcedo meninting. The name Alcedo is the Latin word for a "kingfisher". The specific epithet meninting is the Javanese word for the species. The blue-eared kingfisher is one of seven species in the genus Alcedo and is most closely related to Blyth's kingfisher (Alcedo hercules).

Several plumage variations in the population that occur across its wide distribution range have been recognized as subspecies:

- A. m. coltarti Baker ECS, 1919 – Nepal, northeast India, northern Thailand and Indochina
- A. m. phillipsi Baker ECS, 1927 – southwest India and Sri Lanka
- A. m. scintillans Baker ECS, 1919 – southern Myanmar and Thailand
- A. m. rufigastra Walden, 1873 – Andaman Islands
- A. m. meninting Horsfield, 1821 – southern Malay Peninsula, Borneo, southern Philippines, Islands off the west coast of Sumatra, Java, Lombok, Sulawesi, Banggai and Sula Islands.

Some other subspecies such as verreauxii, callima, subviridis and proxima are not considered to be sufficiently distinct.

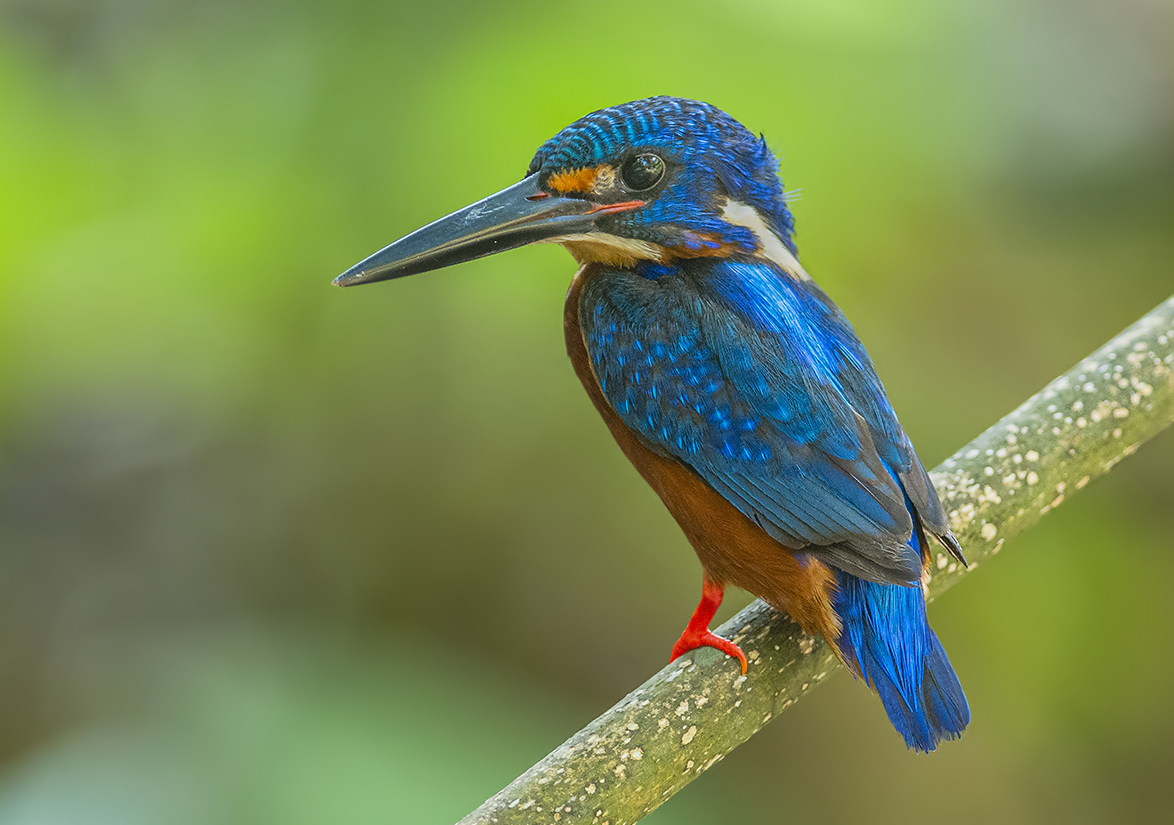
Blue-eared kingfisher (Male) from Guwahati, Assam

== Description ==
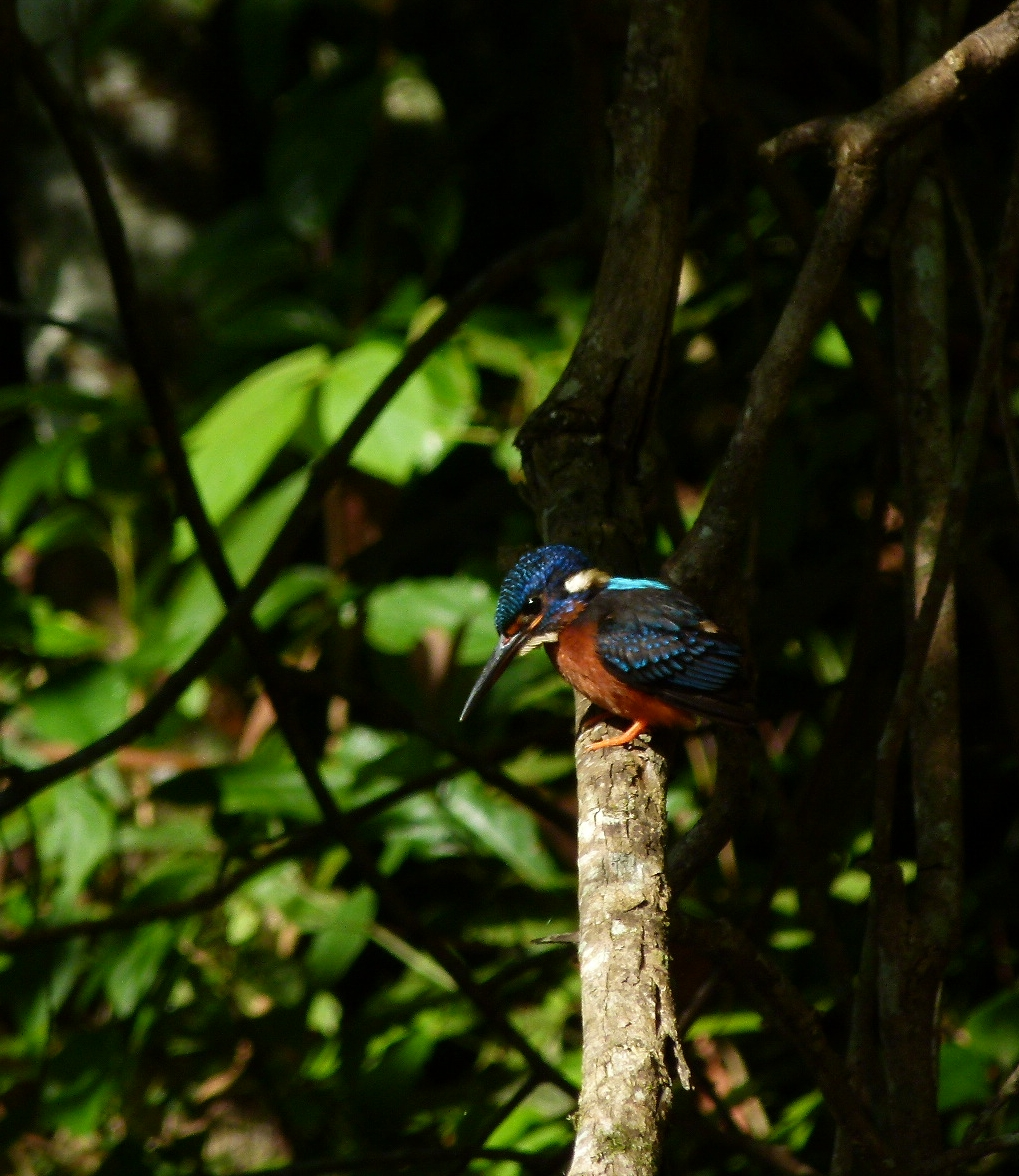
Shaded forest streams are the usual habitat. A. m. phillipsi

This 16 centimetres (6.3 in) long kingfisher is almost identical to the common kingfisher (Alcedo atthis) but is distinguished by the blue ear coverts, darker and more intense cobalt-blue upperparts with richer rufous under parts. The juvenile blue-eared kingfisher has rufous ear-coverts as in the common kingfisher but it usually shows some mottling on the throat and upper breast which disappears when the bird reaches adulthood. Young birds have a reddish bill with whitish tips.

== Distribution and habitat ==
Measurements

Nominate
Culmen		35–48 mm (1.4–1.9 in)
Wing		65–71 mm (2.6–2.8 in)
Tail		29–31 mm (1.1–1.2 in)

coltarti
Culmen		34–36 mm (1.3–1.4 in)
Wing		65–66 mm (2.6–2.6 in)
Tail		26–27 mm (1.0–1.1 in)
Tarsus		7 mm (0.28 in)

The range of this species stretches from India in the west, eastwards across Nepal, Bhutan and Bangladesh, and further into Myanmar, Thailand, Cambodia, Vietnam and Malaysia. The usual habitat is pools or streams in dense evergreen forest and sometimes mangroves, situated under 1,000 metres (3,300 ft) of altitude.

== Behaviour and ecology ==
The blue-eared kingfisher is largely resident within its range. They usually perch on branches overhanging densely shaded streams before diving below to capture prey that includes crustaceans, dragonfly larvae and fish. Other insects including grasshoppers and mantids have been recorded.

The breeding season in India is mainly May to June in northern India and January in southwestern India. The nest is a metre long tunnel in the bank of a forest stream where about five to seven white near spherical eggs are laid.
