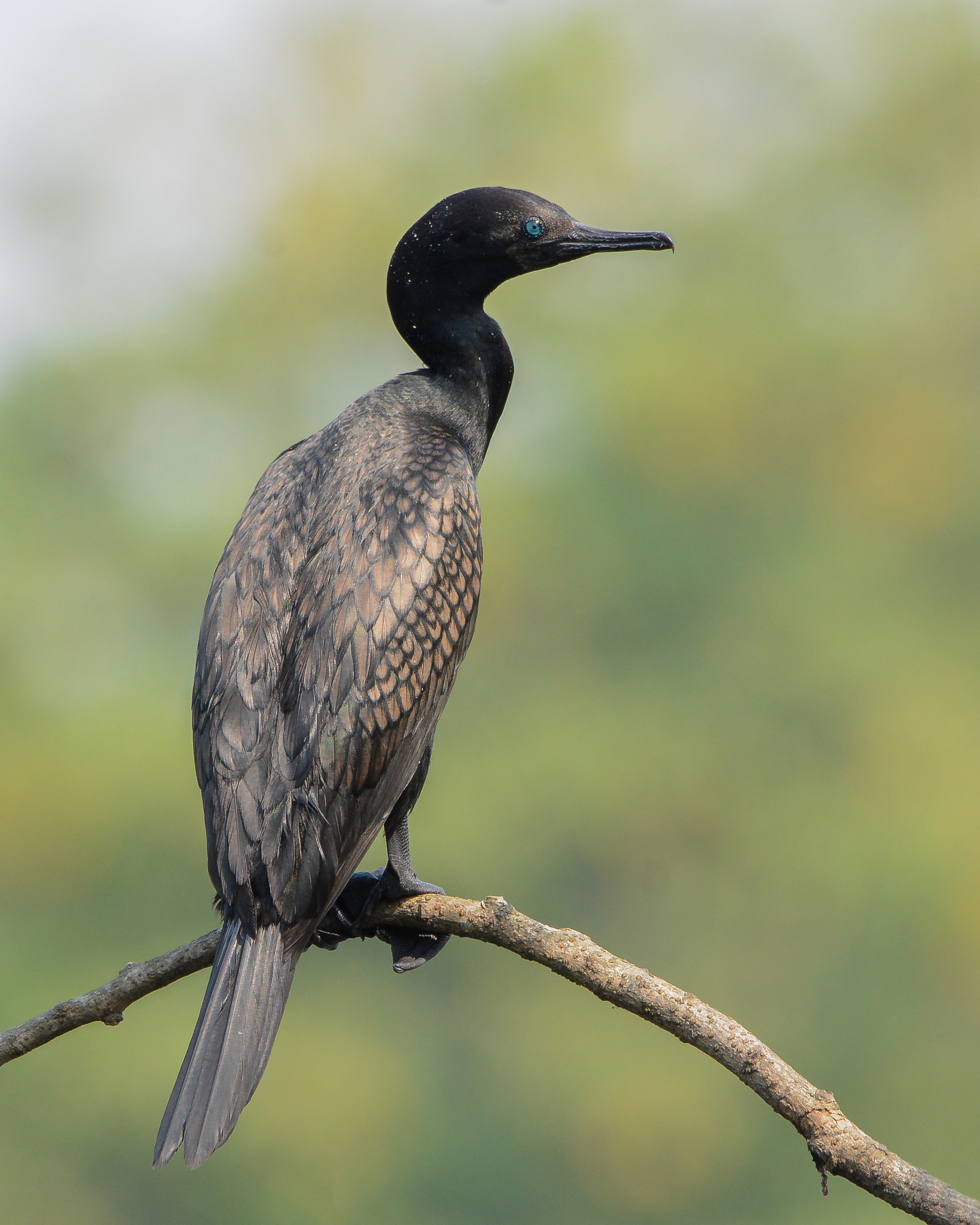
- Non-breeding bird with blue iris

Conservation status
- Least Concern (IUCN 3.1)

Scientific classification
- Kingdom: Animalia
- Phylum: Chordata
- Class: Aves
- Order: Suliformes
- Family: Phalacrocoracidae
- Genus: Phalacrocorax
- Species: P. fuscicollis

Binomial name
- Phalacrocorax fuscicollis Stephens, 1826
- Range of P. fuscicollis

= Indian cormorant =

Species of bird from Asia

The Indian cormorant or Indian shag (Phalacrocorax fuscicollis) is a member of the cormorant family. It is found mainly along the inland waters of the Indian subcontinent but extends west to Sind and east to Thailand and Cambodia. It is a gregarious species that can be easily distinguished from the similar sized little cormorant by its blue eyes, small head with a sloping forehead and a long narrow bill ending in a hooked tip.

== Taxonomy ==
The Indian cormorant was formally described in 1826 by English naturalist James Francis Stephens and given the current binomial name Phalacrocorax fuscicollis. The specific epithet combines the Latin fuscus meaning "dusky" or "brown" with the Modern Latin -collis meaning "-necked". The species is monotypic: no subspecies are recognised.

A molecular phylogenetic study published in 2019 found that the Indian cormorant was sister to the little black cormorant. It is estimated that the two species split 2.5–3.2 million years ago during the late Pliocene.

== Description ==
This medium-sized bronze brown cormorant is scalloped in black on the upper plumage, lacks a crest and has a small and slightly peaked head with a long narrow bill that ends in a hooked tip. The eyes are blue and it has bare yellow facial skin during the non-breeding season. Breeding birds have a short white ear tuft. In some plumages it has a white throat but the white is restricted below the gape unlike in the much larger great cormorant. Sexes are similar, but non-breeding adults and juveniles are browner.

in breeding plumage (note the white tuft near the ear and dull yellow lower mandible)

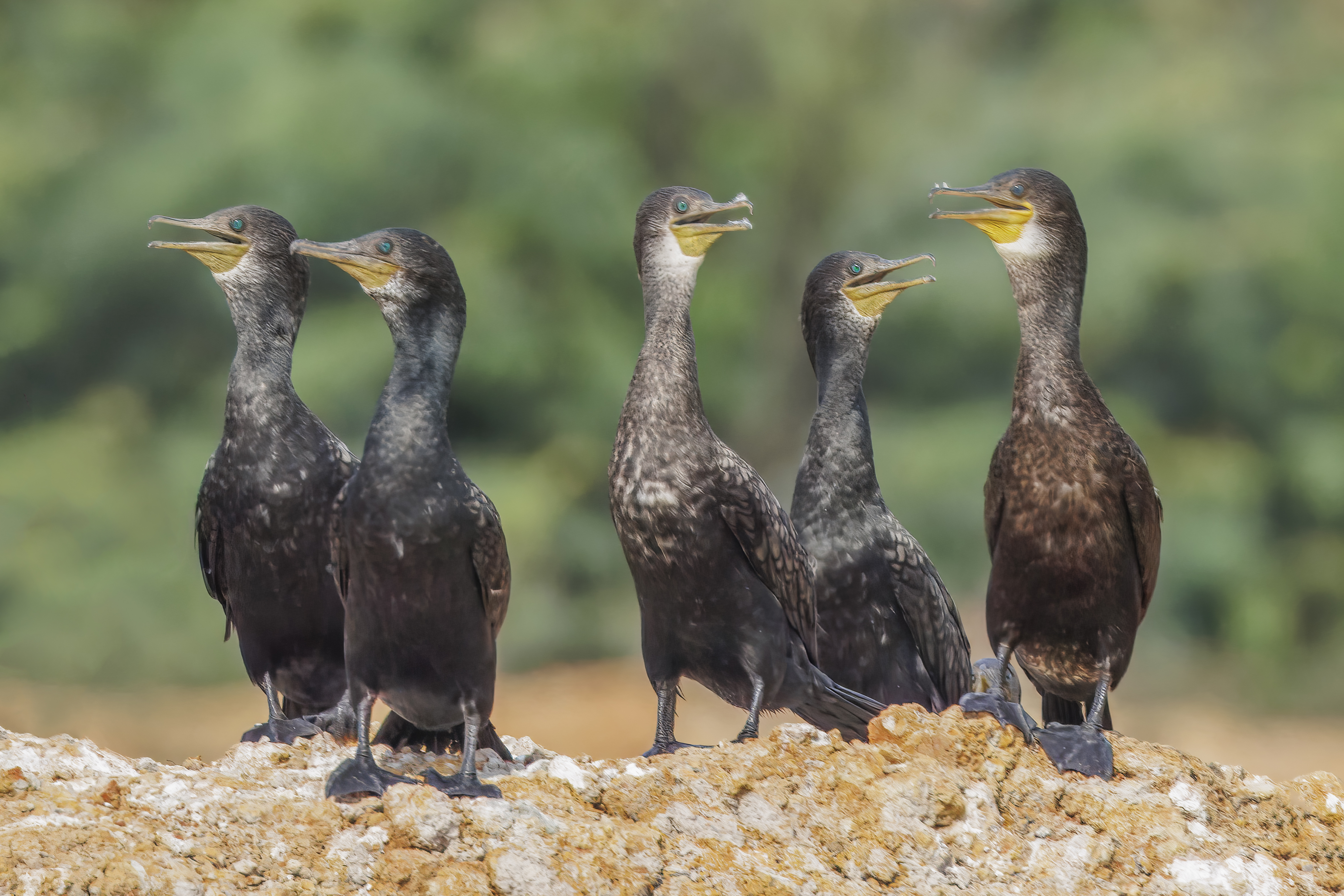
immatures

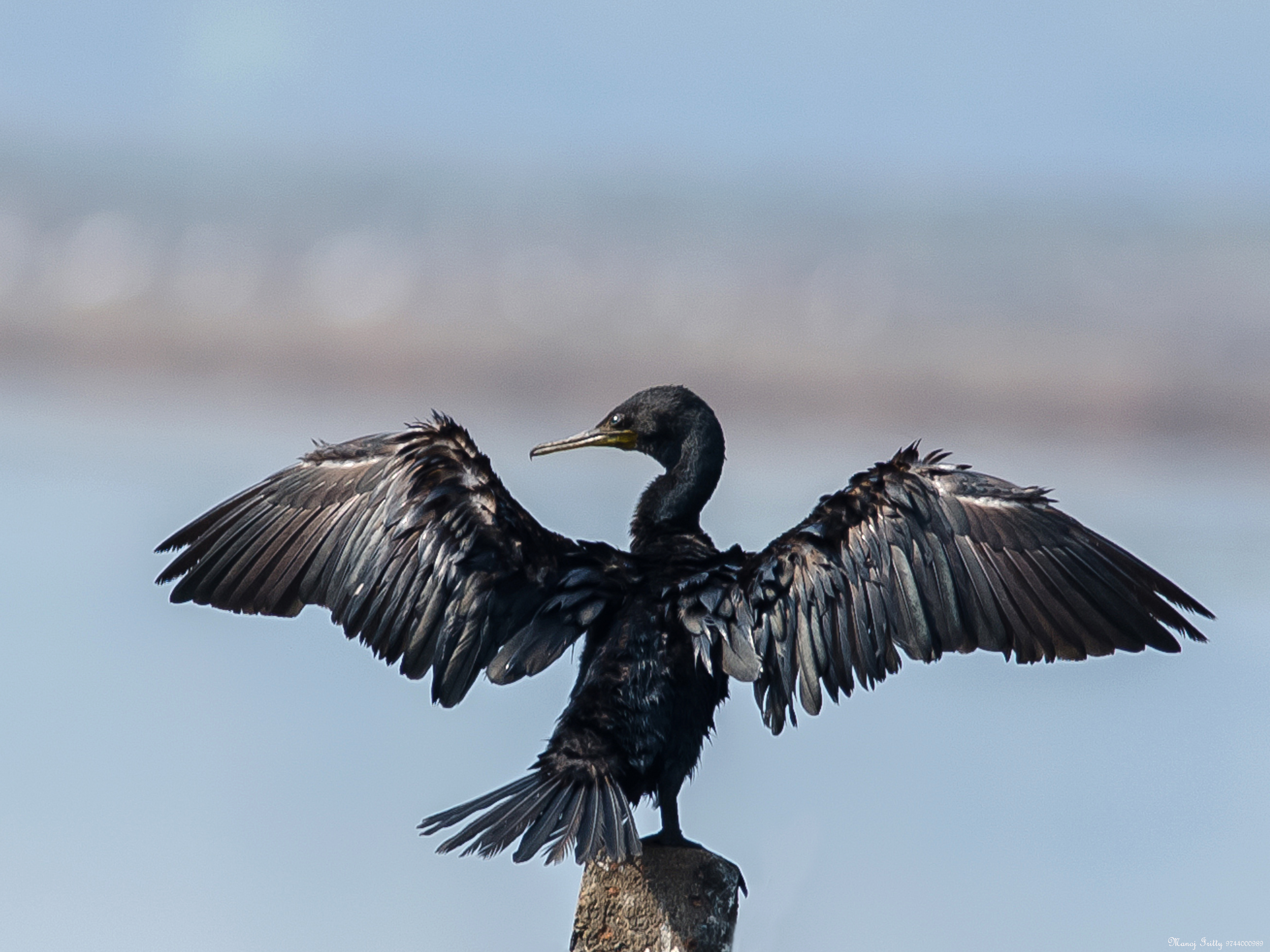
drying wings

== Distribution and habitat ==
This cormorant fishes gregariously in inland rivers or large wetlands of peninsular India and the northern part of Sri Lanka. It also occurs in estuaries and mangroves but not on the open coast. They breed very locally in mixed species breeding colonies. They extend north-east to Assam and eastward into Thailand, Burma and Cambodia.

== Behaviour ==
The breeding season is July to February but depends on rainfall and water conditions. In northern India, they breed from July to February and in Sri Lanka, between November and February. The nest is a platform of twigs placed in the forks of partially submerged trees or of those growing on the islands. The nests are similar to those of other Indian cormorants, storks or waterbirds in dense colonies, often with several tiers of nests. The usual clutch is three to five eggs which are bluish green and with a chalky surface.

The Indian cormorant makes short dives to capture the fish and a group will often fish communally, forming a broad front to drive fish into a corner.

An echinostomatid parasite has been described from Sindh from this species.

Measurements

Across range
Length	♂	510–535 mm (20.1–21.1 in)
	♀	475–510 mm (18.7–20.1 in)
Culmen		54–58 mm (2.1–2.3 in)
Tail	♂	138–142 mm (5.4–5.6 in)
	♀	94–96 mm (3.7–3.8 in)
Tarsus		47–52 mm (1.9–2.0 in)
