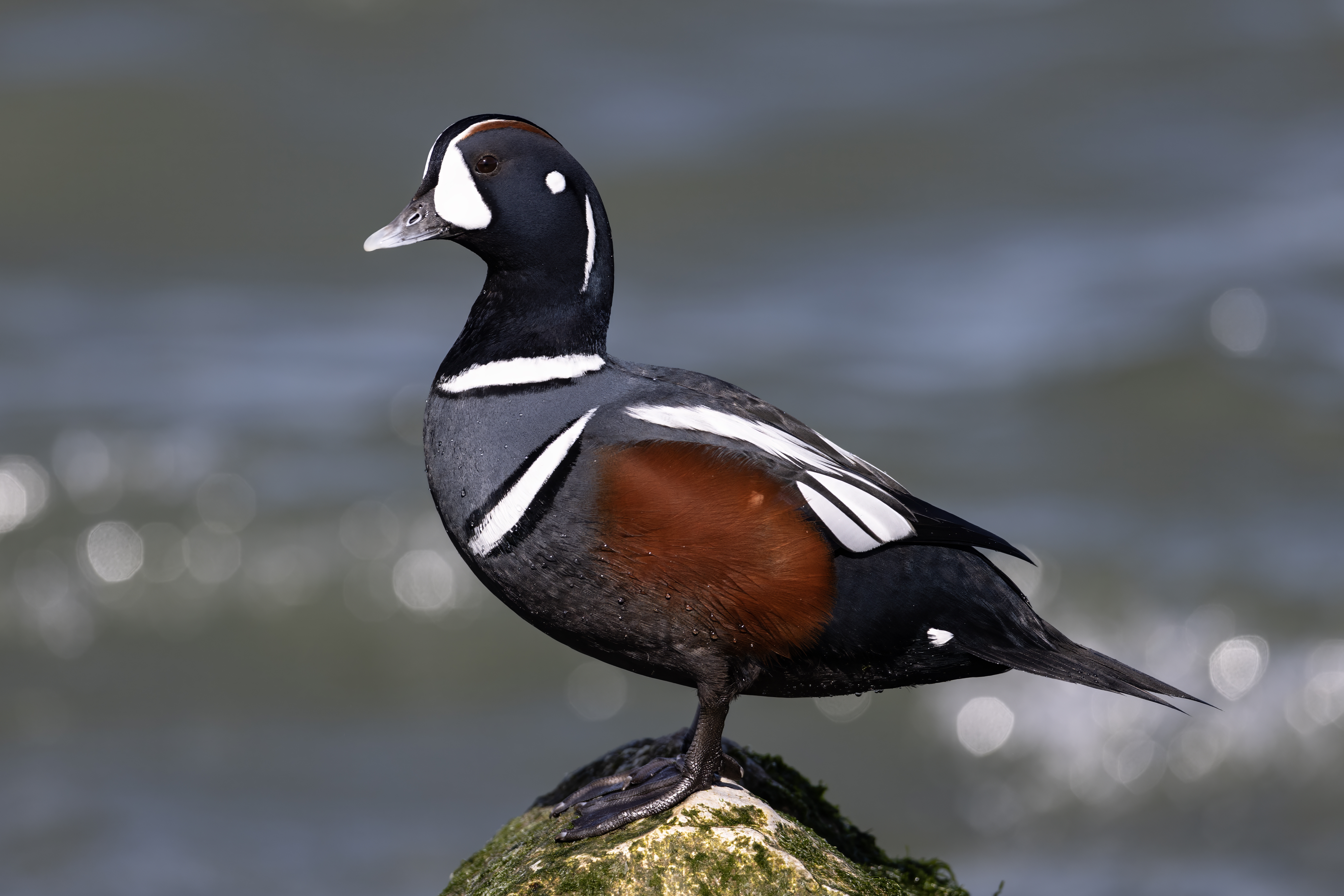
- Harlequin drake

Conservation status
- Least Concern (IUCN 3.1)

Scientific classification
- Kingdom: Animalia
- Phylum: Chordata
- Class: Aves
- Order: Anseriformes
- Family: Anatidae
- Genus: Histrionicus; Lesson, 1828
- Species: H. histrionicus

Binomial name
- Histrionicus histrionicus (Linnaeus, 1758)

Subspecies
- H. h. pacificus (Brooks, 1915) (disputed); H. h. histrionicus (Linnaeus, 1758)

Synonyms
- Ocyplonessa Brodkorb, 1961; Anas histrionica Linnaeus, 1758; Anas minuta Linnaeus, 1758

= Harlequin duck =

Species of bird

The harlequin duck (Histrionicus histrionicus) is a small sea duck. It takes its name from Harlequin (Italian Arlecchino, French Arlequin), a colourfully dressed character in the commedia dell'arte theatre of Italy. The species name comes from the Latin word histrio, meaning "actor". Other names include painted duck, totem pole duck, rock duck, glacier duck, mountain duck, white-eyed diver, squeaker, lords and ladies and blue streak.

== Taxonomy ==
In 1747 the English naturalist George Edwards included an illustration and a description of the harlequin duck in the second volume of his A Natural History of Uncommon Birds. He used the English name "The Dusky and Spotted Duck". Edwards based his hand-coloured etching on a preserved specimen that had been brought to London from Newfoundland in eastern Canada. When in 1758 the Swedish naturalist Carl Linnaeus updated his Systema Naturae for the tenth edition, he placed the harlequin duck with the ducks, geese and swans in the genus Anas.

Linnaeus included a brief description, coined the binomial name Anas histrionica and cited Edwards' work. The harlequin duck is now the only extant species placed in the genus Histrionicus that was introduced in 1828 by the French naturalist René Lesson. The species is monotypic: no subspecies are recognised. The name histrionicus is from Latin and means "theatrical" or "like a harlequin" (histrio means "actor").

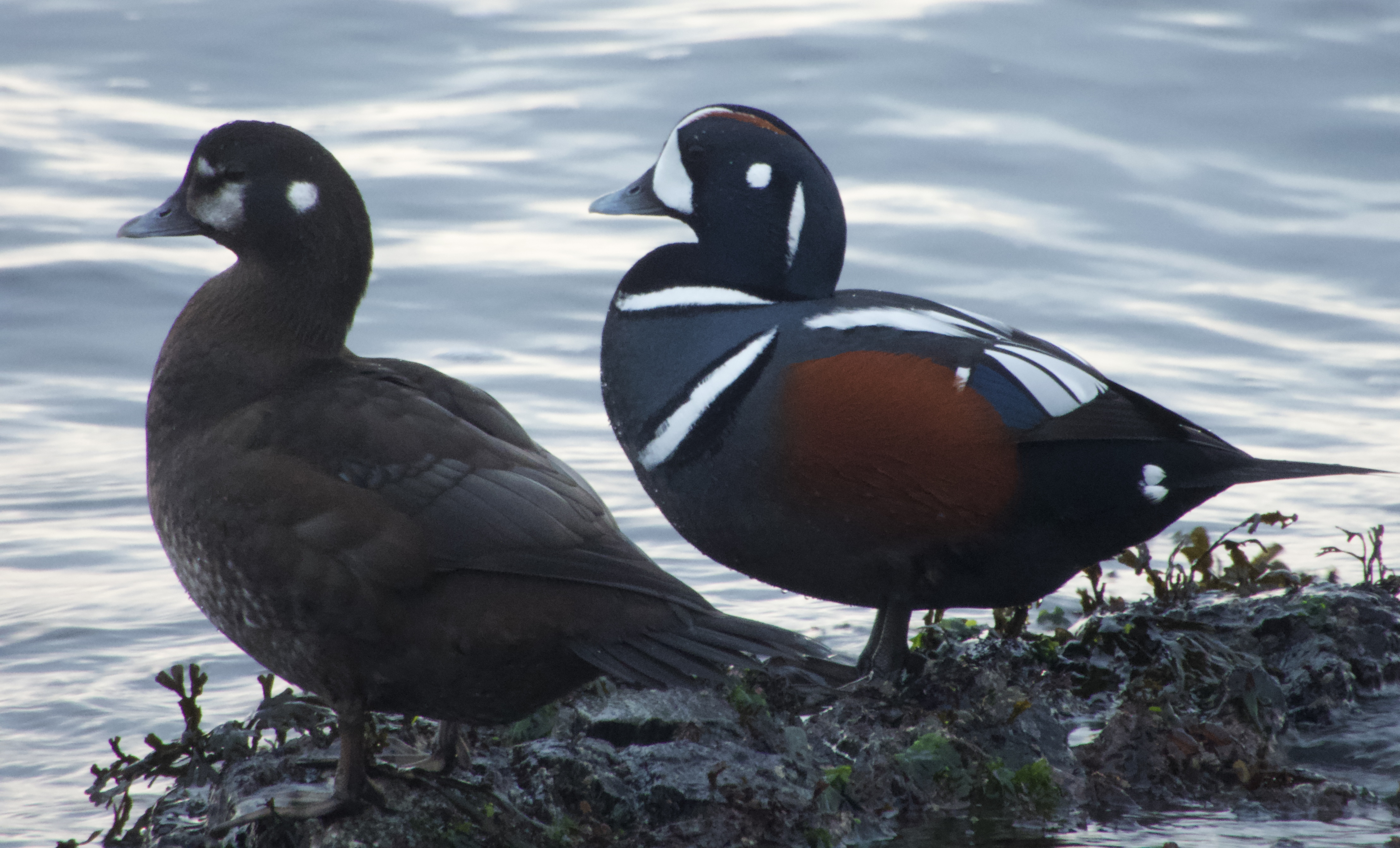
A pair of harlequin ducks, hen (left) and drake (right)

Two prehistoric harlequin ducks have been described from fossils, although both were initially placed in distinct genera: Histrionicus shotwelli is known from Middle to Late Miocene deposits of Oregon, United States and was considered to form a distinct monotypic genus, Ocyplonessa. Histrionicus ceruttii, which lived in California during the Late Pliocene, was at first taken to be a species of the related genus Melanitta.

== Description ==
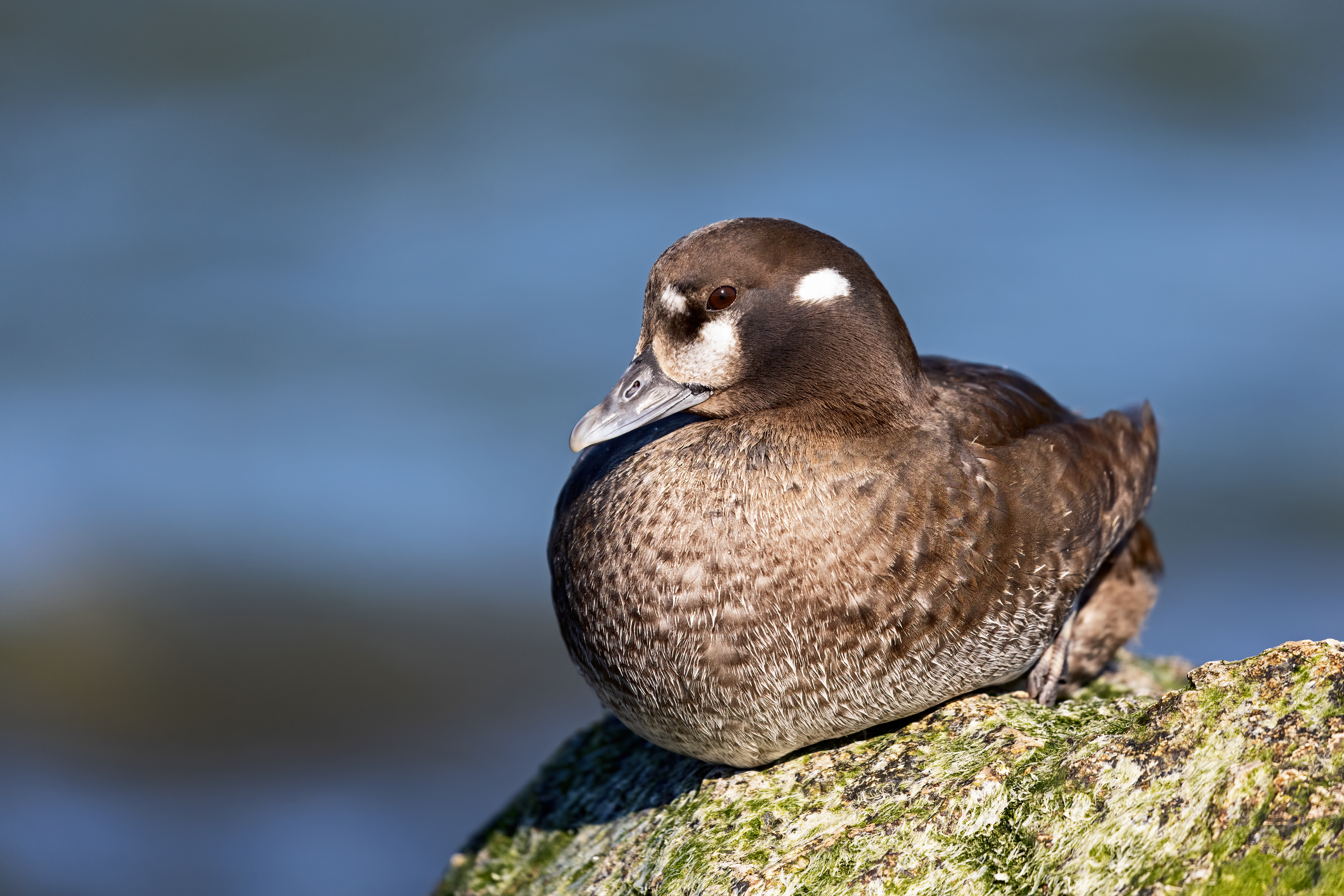
Harlequin hen

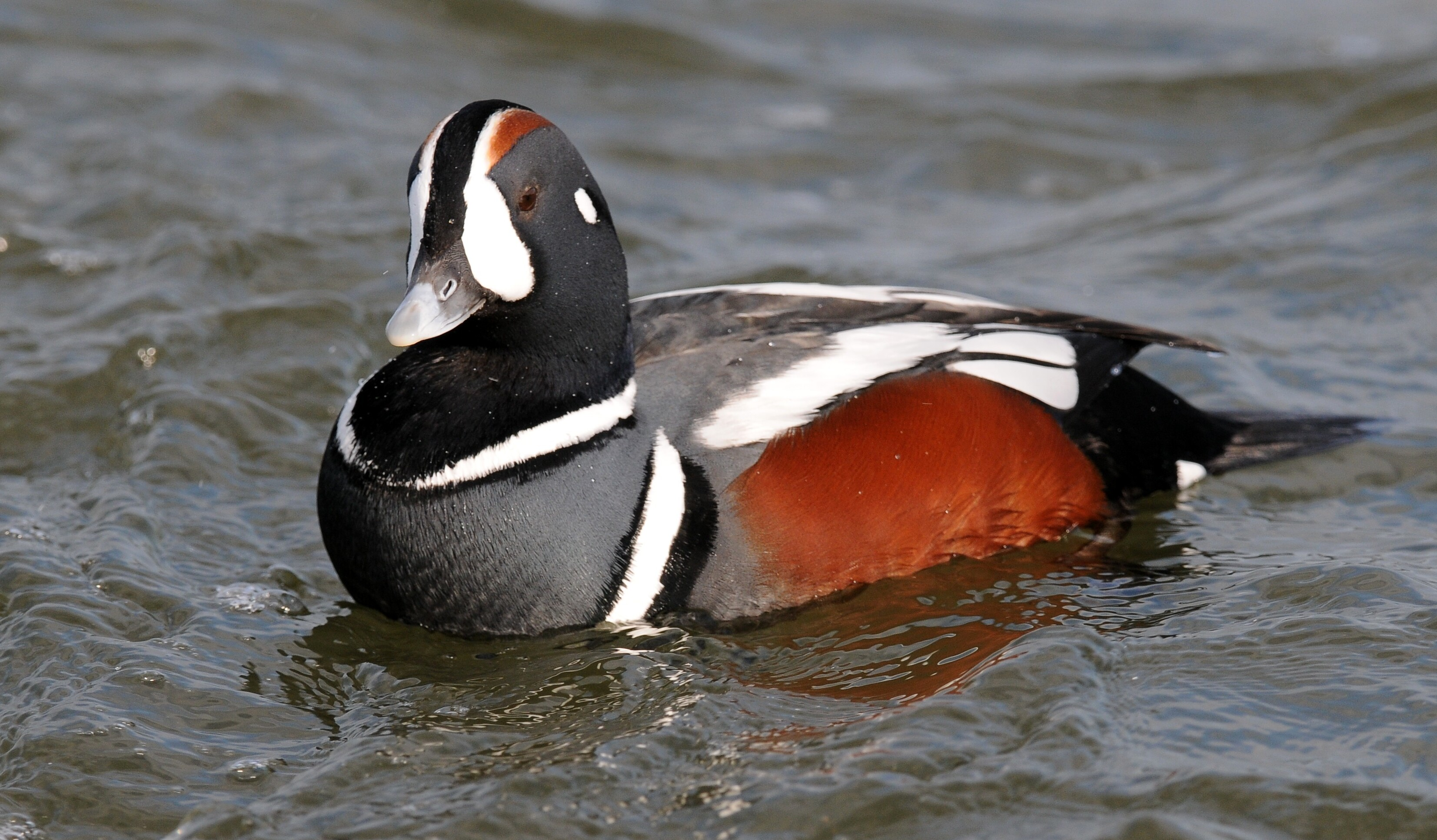
Adult drake

Adult breeding males have a colorful and complex plumage pattern. The head and neck are dark slate blue with a large white crescent marking in front of the eye that extends up to the crest, a small round dot behind the eye, and a larger oval spot down the side of the neck. A black crown stripe runs over the top of the head, with chestnut patches on either side. A black-bordered white collar separates the head from the breast. The body is largely a lighter slate blue with chestnut sides. A black-bordered white bar divides the breast vertically from the sides. The tail is black, long and pointed. The speculum is metallic blue. The inner secondary feathers are white and form white markings over the back when folded. The bill is blue-grey and the eye is reddish. Adult females are less colourful, with brownish-grey plumage with three white patches on the head: a round spot behind the eye, a larger patch from the eye to the bill and a small spot above the eye.

Standard Measurements
length	15–17 in (380–430 mm)
weight	600 g (1.3 lb)
wingspan	26 in (660 mm)
wing	188–202 mm (7.4–8.0 in)
tail	77–101.5 mm (3.03–4.00 in)
culmen	25–27 mm (0.98–1.06 in)
tarsus	36.5–38.5 mm (1.44–1.52 in)

== Distribution and habitat ==
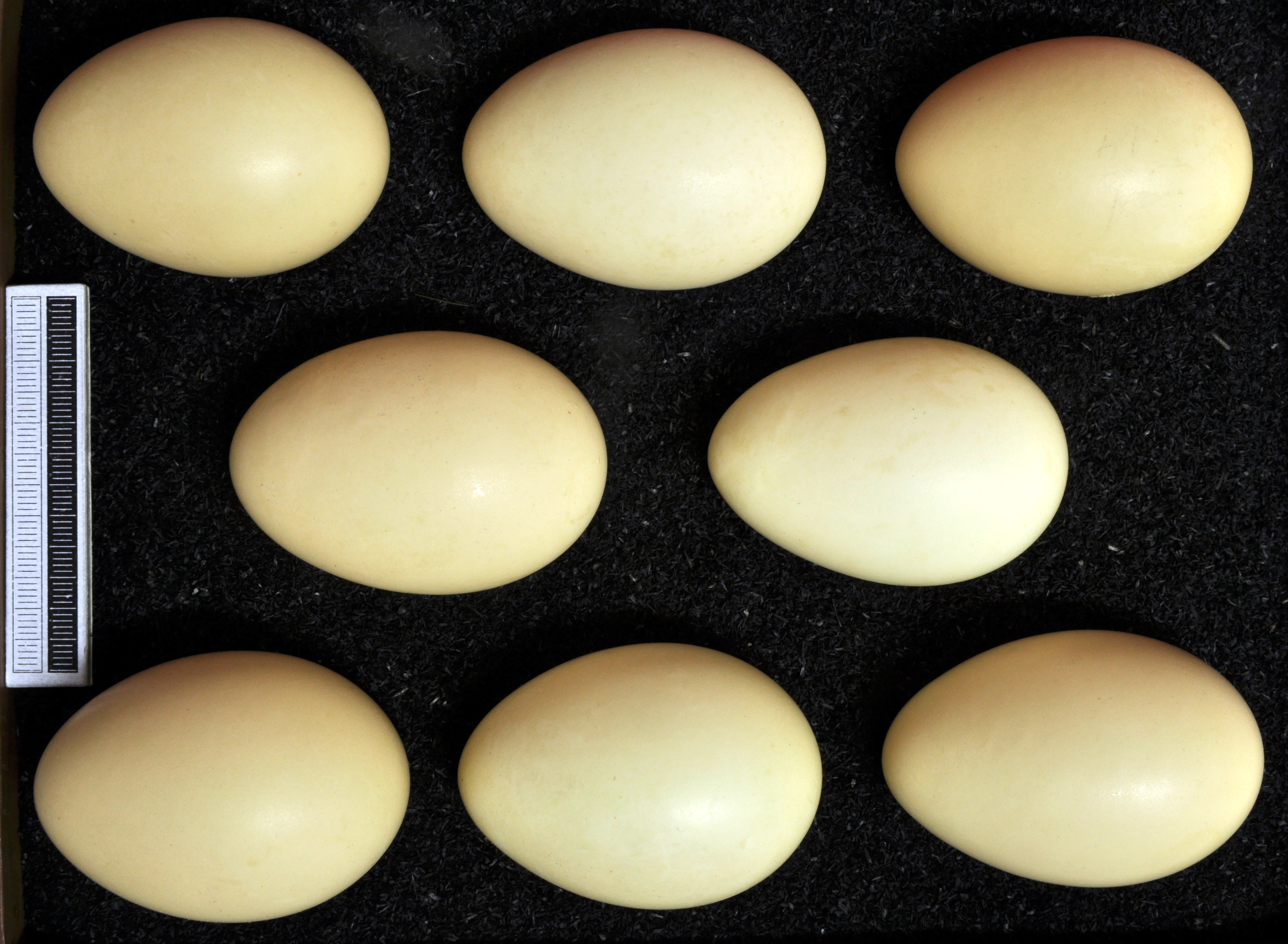
Eggs, Collection Museum Wiesbaden

Their breeding habitat is cold fast moving streams in northwestern and northeastern North America, Greenland, Iceland and eastern Russia. The nest is usually located in a well-concealed location on the ground near a stream. They are usually found near pounding surf and white water. They are short distance migrants and most winter near rocky shorelines on the Atlantic and Pacific coasts. They are very rare migrants to western Europe.

The eastern North American population is declining and is considered endangered. Possible causes include loss of habitat due to hydroelectric projects and loss of life due to oil spills near coastal areas.

== Behaviour ==
These birds feed by swimming under water or diving. They also dabble. They eat molluscs, crustaceans and insects. Harlequins have smooth, densely packed feathers that trap a lot of air within them. This is vital for insulating such small bodies against the chilly waters they ply. It also makes them exceptionally buoyant, making them bounce like corks after dives.

=== Breeding ===
Harlequin ducks adhere to a monogamous mating system, during their winter mating season will form multi-year pair bonds, though the males rarely participate in paternal care. Young ducks begin courtship in their first winter, females will find success by the second year, yet the males will rarely form a persistent bond before their fourth winter. Harlequin males will have an alternate plumage during this winter mating season.

The eggs measure 5.1–6.2 cm (2.0–2.4 in) in length and 3.6–4.1 cm (1.4–1.6 in) in width. 4 to 8 eggs are laid per clutch, which are incubated for 27–29 days.

Both female and male harlequins exercise mate choice preference and pair-bond defense, to demonstrate fidelity to their partner. Either partner is able to divorce the pair-bond to pursue a higher-quality option, however this behavior is uncommon.
