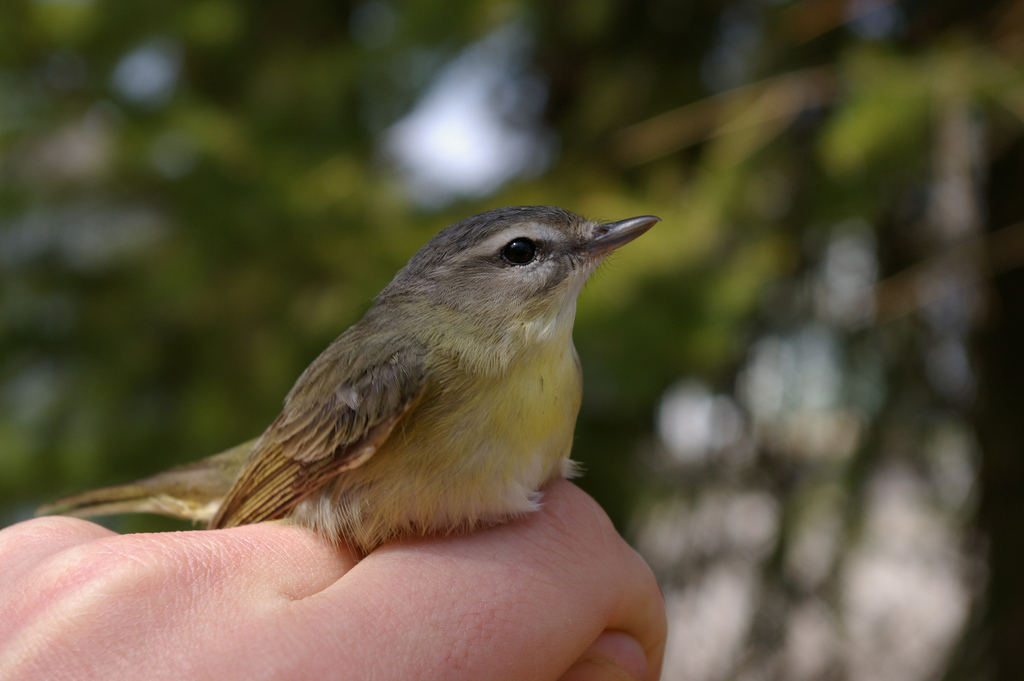

Conservation status
- Least Concern (IUCN 3.1)

Scientific classification
- Kingdom: Animalia
- Phylum: Chordata
- Class: Aves
- Order: Passeriformes
- Family: Vireonidae
- Genus: Vireo
- Species: V. philadelphicus

Binomial name
- Vireo philadelphicus (Cassin, 1851)

= Philadelphia vireo =

Species of bird

The Philadelphia vireo (Vireo philadelphicus) is a small North American songbird in the vireo family (Vireonidae). "Vireo" is a Latin word referring to a green migratory bird, perhaps the female golden oriole, possibly the European greenfinch. The specific philadelphicus is for the city of Philadelphia.

== Description ==
Adults are mainly olive-brown on the upperparts with yellow underparts; they have dark eyes and a grey crown. They have no wing bars and no eye ring. There is a dark line through the eyes and a white stripe just over them. They have thick blue-grey legs and a stout bill. The Philadelphia vireo is similar in appearance to the warbling vireo, but can be reliably distinguished by having much yellower underparts, and dark lores.

Standard Measurements
| length | 4.5–5 in (110–130 mm) |
| weight | 12 g (0.42 oz) |
| wingspan | 8 in (200 mm) |
| wing | 65.4–70 mm (2.57–2.76 in) |
| tail | 45–52 mm (1.8–2.0 in) |
| culmen | 9–11 mm (0.35–0.43 in) |
| tarsus | 16–17 mm (0.63–0.67 in) |

== Ecology ==
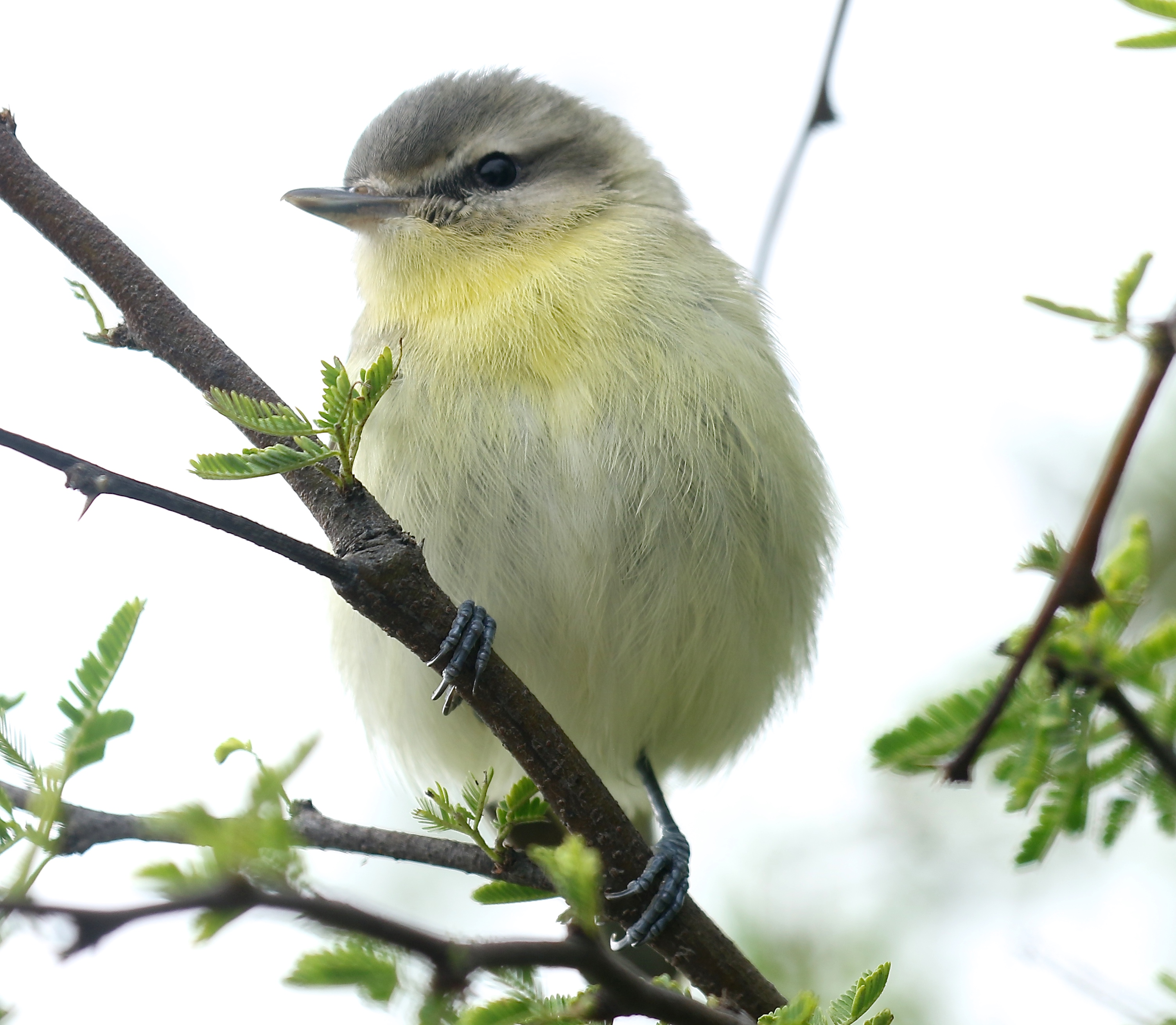
South Padre Island - Texas

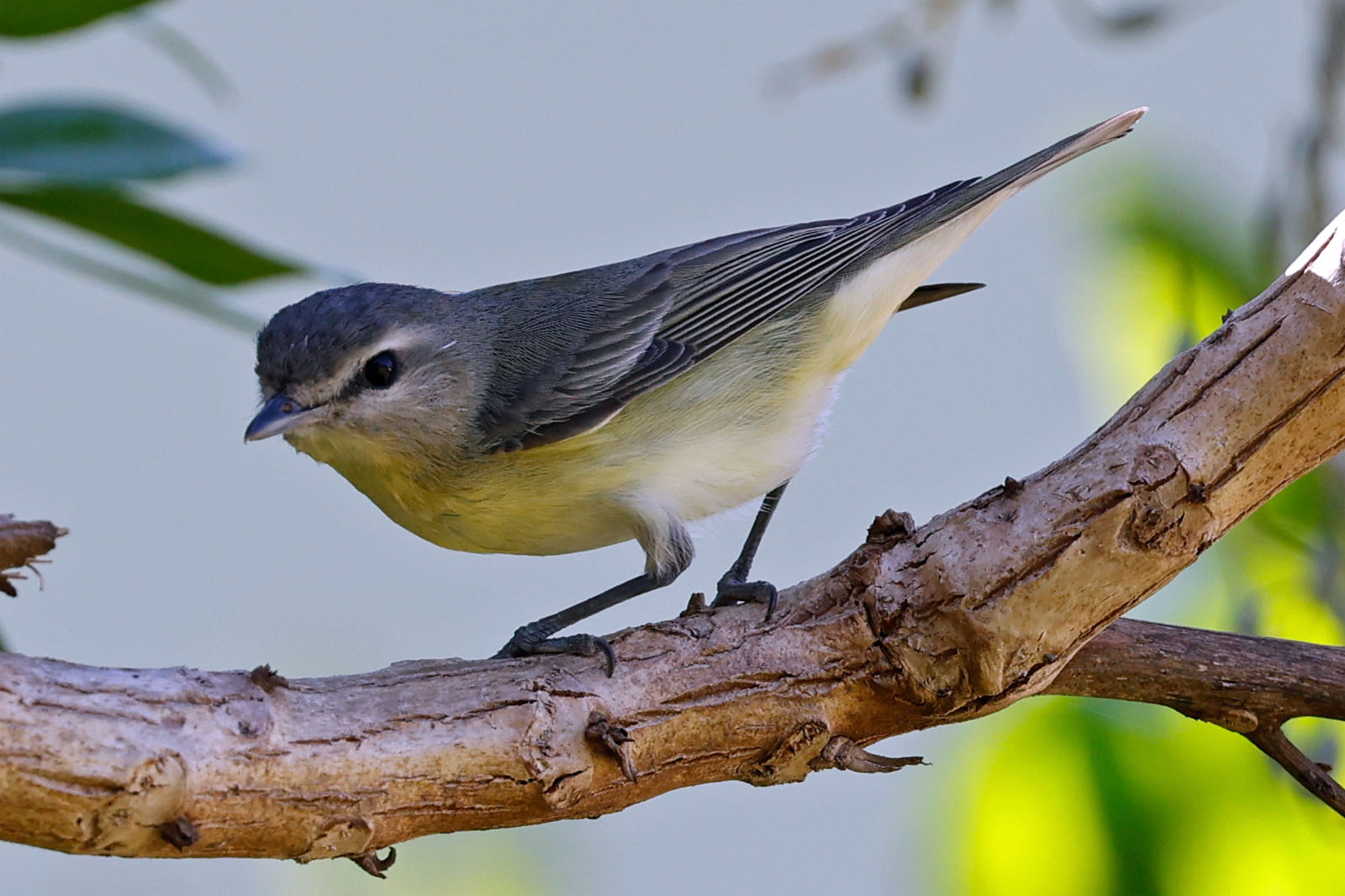
In San Jose, Costa Rica, on 7 March 2024.

Their breeding habitat is the edges of deciduous and mixed woods across Canada. They make a basket-shaped cup nest in a fork of a tree branch, usually placed relatively high. The female lays 3 to 5 lightly spotted white eggs. Incubation, by both parents, lasts up to 14 days.

These birds migrate to Mexico and Central America. This vireo is a very rare vagrant to western Europe. They are unlikely to visit Philadelphia, except in migration.

They forage for insects in trees, sometimes hovering or flying to catch insects in flight. They also eat berries, especially before migration.

The songs and calls of Philadelphia vireo are three to five notes, weeezh weeezh weeezh, very similar to those of the red-eyed vireo, but with slightly longer pauses between phrases and higher notes.
