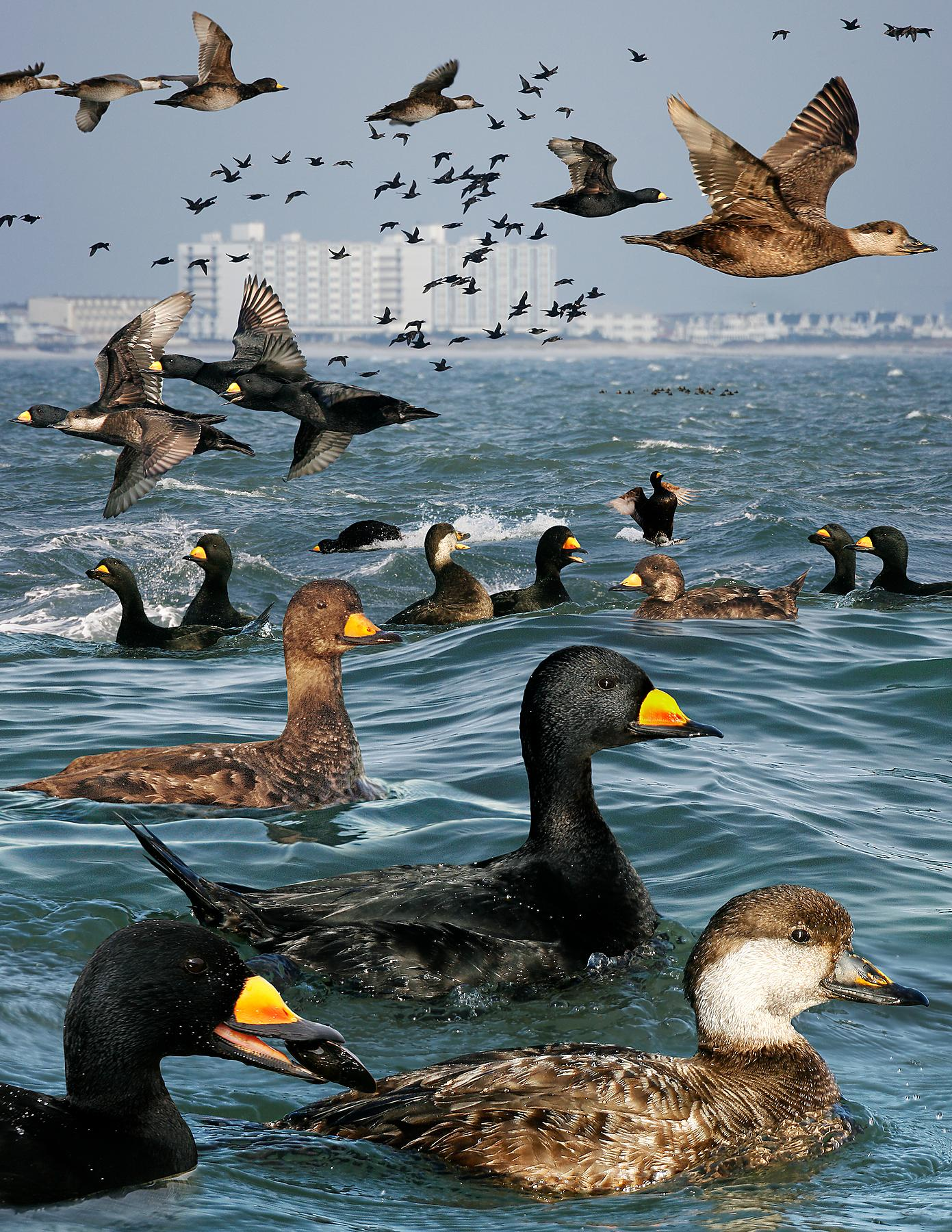

Conservation status
- Near Threatened (IUCN 3.1)

Scientific classification
- Kingdom: Animalia
- Phylum: Chordata
- Class: Aves
- Order: Anseriformes
- Family: Anatidae
- Genus: Melanitta
- Subgenus: Oidemia
- Species: M. americana

Binomial name
- Melanitta americana (Swainson, 1832)

Synonyms
- Melanitta nigra americana

= Black scoter =

Species of bird

The black scoter or American scoter (Melanitta americana) is a large sea duck, 43 to 49 cm (17 to 19 in) in length. The genus name is derived from Ancient Greek melas "black" and netta "duck". The species name is from the Latin for "American".

Together with the common scoter M. nigra, it forms the subgenus Oidemia; the two are sometimes considered conspecific, the black scoter then being referred to as M. nigra americana. Its French name, used in parts of its Canadian range, is macreuse noire (also meaning "black scoter"). The species is listed as Near Threatened by the IUCN.

== Description ==
This large sea duck is characterised by its bulky shape and large bill. The adult male is all black with a very bulbous bill which is mostly yellow. The female is a brown bird with pale cheeks, very similar to female common scoter. The adult female averages about 980 g (2.16 lb) and 45 cm (18 in) in length, while the adult male is on average 1,100 g (2.4 lb) and 49 cm (19 in) in length.

This species can be distinguished from other scoters, apart from common scoter, by the lack of white anywhere on the drake, and the more extensive pale areas on the female.

Standard Measurements
length	430–550 mm (17–21.5 in)
weight	950 g (2.09 lb)
wingspan	710 mm (28 in)
wing	213–233 mm (8.4–9.2 in)
tail	83–97 mm (3.3–3.8 in)
culmen	42–45.5 mm (1.65–1.79 in)
tarsus	45–48.5 mm (1.77–1.91 in)

=== Vocalisations ===
The black scoter and common scoter have diagnosably distinct vocalisations.

== Distribution and habitat ==
The black scoter breeds in the far north of North America in Labrador and Newfoundland to the southeast and northwest of Hudson Bay. It also occurs on the Siberian side of the Bering Straits east of the Yana River. It winters farther south in temperate zones, on the coasts of the northern US and Canada, on the Pacific coast south to the San Francisco Bay region and on the Atlantic and Gulf of Mexico coasts, and in Asia as far south as China.

Some birds may over-winter on the Great Lakes. This species is a very rare vagrant to western Europe; only drakes are safely identifiable out of range, so females are likely to be undetected.

== Ecology ==
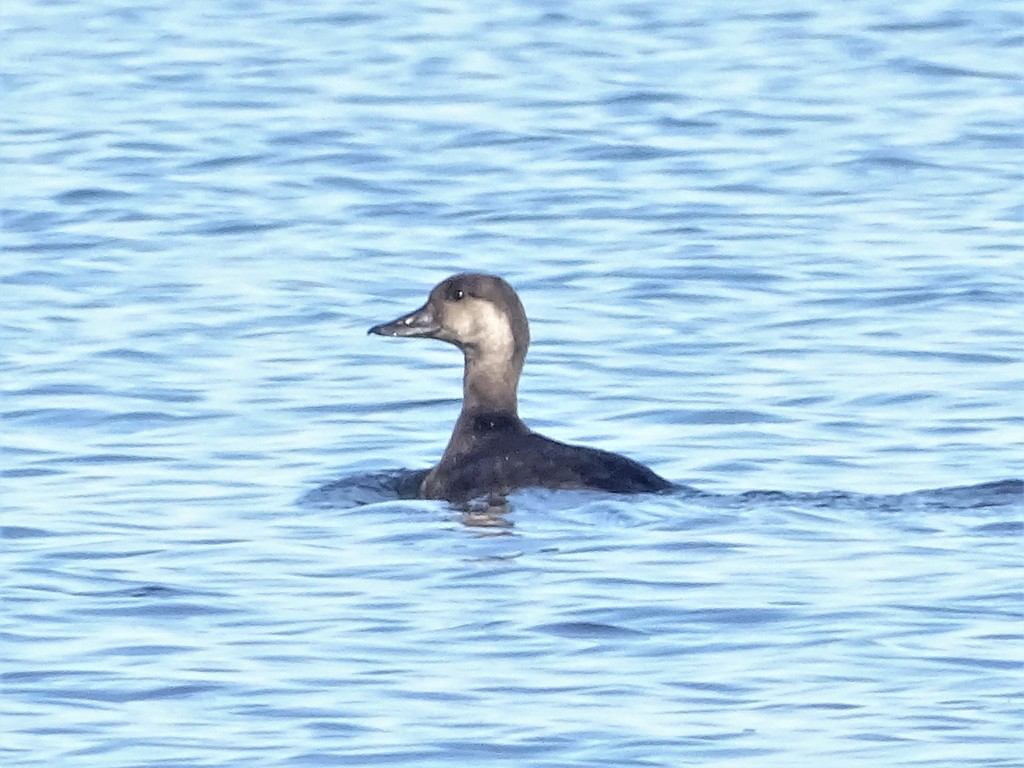
Female black scoter photographed in Ottawa, Ontario

This species dives for crustaceans and molluscs while migrating or wintering on the sea-coasts, and feeds on insects and their larvae, especially caddisflies, fish eggs and, more rarely, vegetation such as duck weed while nesting on freshwater. It forms large flocks on suitable coastal waters in winter quarters. These are tightly packed, and the birds tend to take off together; in the breeding season they are less social. It has been suggested that in coastal waters this species prefers sheltered embayments, and possibly waters that include some mixed depths.

Black scoters nest later than most other ducks in North America. Pairs form in late winter or spring. The lined nest is built on the ground close to the sea, lakes or rivers, in woodland or tundra. 5–7 eggs are laid. Each eggs weighs from 60–74 g (2.1–2.6 oz), or 8% of the females body weight, and measure 6.26–6.53 cm (2.5–2.6 in) in length and 4.4–4.5 cm (1.7–1.8 in) in width. The incubation period may range from 27 to 31 days. Females brood their young extensively for about 3 weeks, after which the still flightless young must fend for themselves.

The male performs a diagnostic downward head movement when stretching his wings.
