= Bird measurement =

Bird biometrics

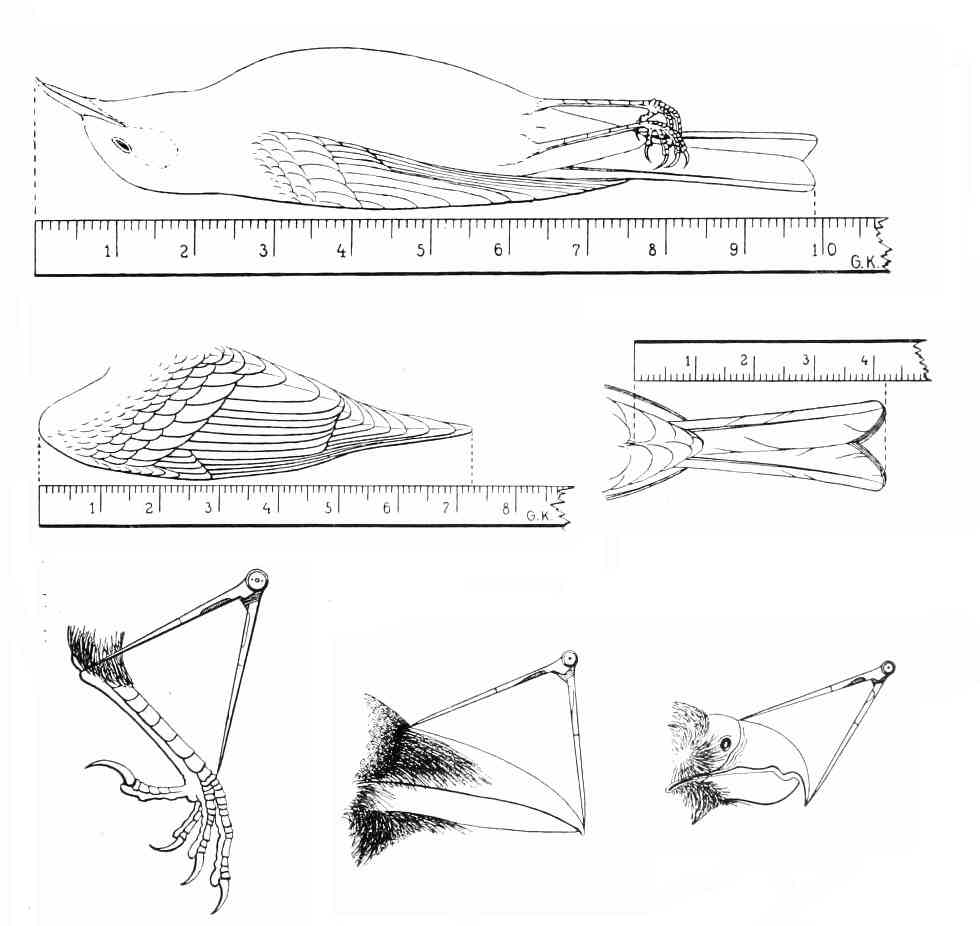
Most measurement requires the use of calipers. Here, the measurement of length, wing, tail, tarsus, and two forms of culmen measurement are shown.

Bird measurement or bird biometrics are approaches to quantify the size of birds in scientific studies. The variation in dimensions and weights across birds is one of the fundamental sources of diversity among birds, and even Within species, dimensions may vary across populations within species, between the sexes and depending on age and condition.

For measurements to be useful, they must be well-defined to be consistent and comparable with those taken by others or at other points in time. Measurements can be useful to identify species, quantify functional and ecomorphological differences, study growth, variation between geographically separated forms, identify differences between the sexes, age or otherwise characterize individual birds. While certain measurements are regularly taken to study living birds, others apply only to specimens in bird collections or are measurable only in the laboratory. The conventions used for measurement can vary between authors and works, making comparisons of sizes a matter that needs considerable care.

== Methods and considerations ==
All measurements are prone to error, both systematic and random. Measuring specific bird characteristics can further vary greatly depending on the method used. The total length of a bird is sometimes measured by putting a dead bird on its back and gently pressing the head so that the bill points to the tail tip can be measured. However, this can vary with the degree of neck stretching and cannot be measured in preserved skins in bird collections. The wing length, usually defined as the distance between the carpometacarpal joint and the most extended primary, can vary depending on whether the natural curvature of the wing is preserved or the measurement is taken on a flattened wing. The measurement can vary depending on whether a flexible tape measure is used over the curve or is measured with a rigid ruler. The definition of the length of the tail can vary when some of them have elongations, forking or other modifications. The weights of birds are even more prone to variability with their feeding and health condition and in the case of migratory species differ quite widely across seasons even for a single individual.

Despite the variations, measurements are routinely taken in taxonomic studies and the process of bird ringing. Several of the measurements are considered reliable and well-defined, at least in most birds. Although field measurements are usually univariate, laboratory techniques can often make use of multivariate measurements derived from an analysis of variation and correlations of these univariate measures. These can usually indicate variations more reliably.

Different measurements of a bird describe different anatomical dimensions and are not necessarily interchangeable. In particular, wing length or wing chord describes a single wing, whereas wingspan measures the distance between the tips of both fully extended wings. Using one measurement as a direct substitute for another can therefore produce misleading comparisons, especially when measurement methods differ between datasets.

== Total body length ==
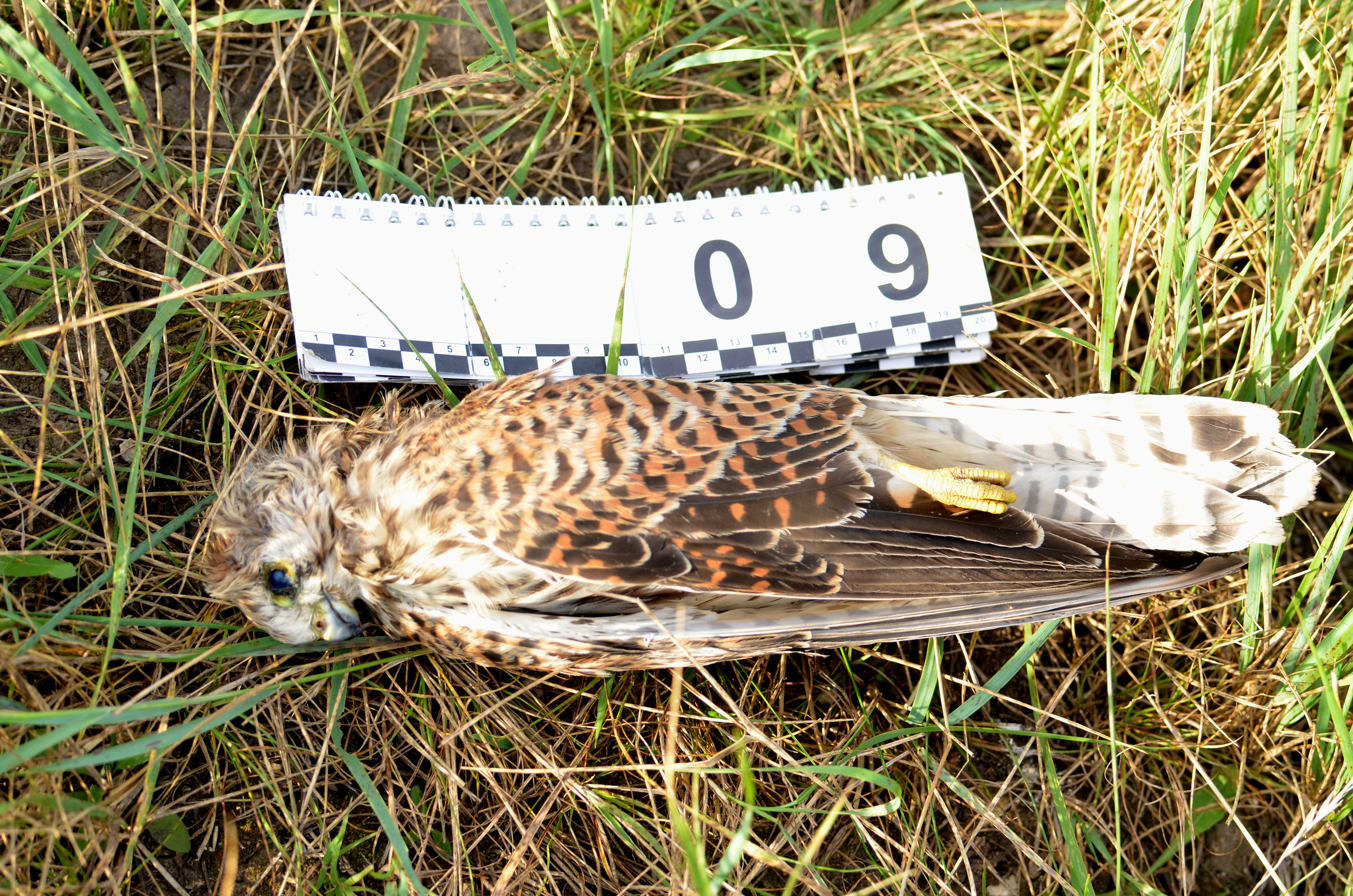
Measuring a common kestrel electrocuted on a power line

The total length of the body (also bill-to-tail length) of a bird is usually measured from dead specimens before being skinned for preservation. The measurement is made by laying the bird on its back, stretching out the neck, making the beak point forward, and measuring between the tip of the bill and the tip of the tail. However, This measurement is prone to error and is rarely used for any comparative or other scientific study.

== Culmen ==
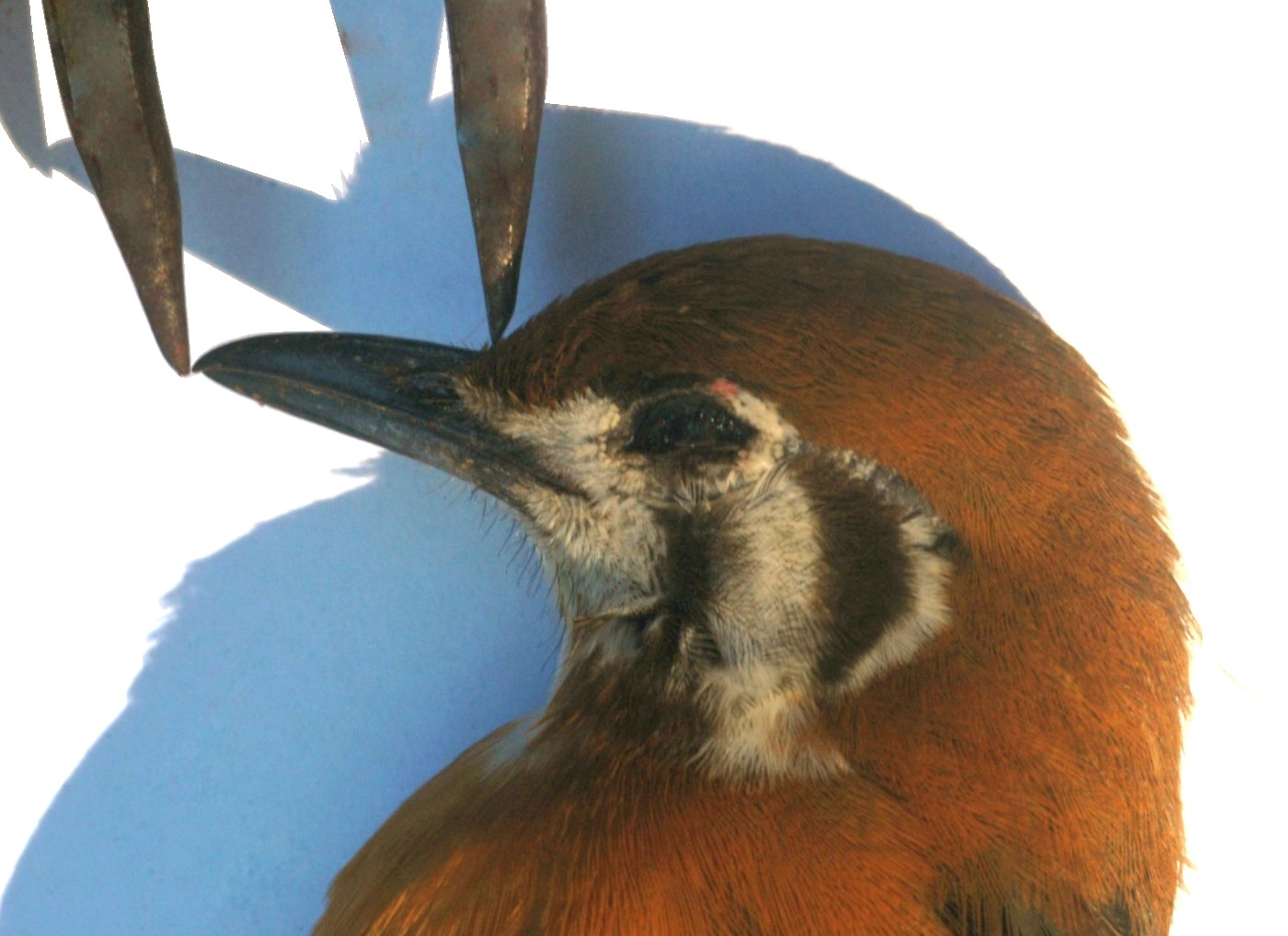
Measuring the culmen

The upper margin of the beak or bill is referred to as the culmen. The measurement is taken using calipers with one jaw at the tip of the upper mandible and the other at the base of the bill (at the junction with the skull, a measurement called "total culmen") or where the feathers begin (a measurement called "exposed culmen"). In the case of birds of prey, where the tip of the mandible may form a long festoon, the festoon's length may also be measured separately. In birds of prey, the measurement is usually from the bill tip to the ceres. In some birds, the distance between the back of the skull and the tip of the beak may be more suitable and less prone to variation, which results from the difficulty of interpreting the feathered base of the mandible.

== Head ==
In some cases, measuring the distance between the back of the skull and the tip of the bill is more reliable. This measure is then termed as the head. This measurement is, however, not suitable for use with living birds that have strong neck musculature, such as cormorants.

== Tarsus ==
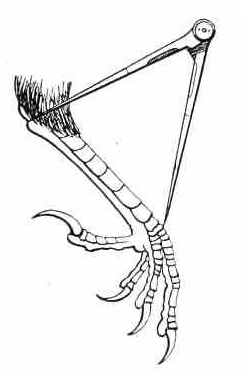
Tarsus

The shank of the bird is usually exposed, and the length from the inner bend of the tibiotarsal articulation to the base of the toes, which is often marked by a difference in the scalation, is used as a standard measure. In most cases, the tarsus is held bent, but in some cases, the length of this bone, as visible on the outer side of the bend to the base of the toes, may be measured.

== Foot ==
In the case of cranes and bustards, the length of the tarsus is often measured along with the length of the longest toe to the tip of the claw.

== Tail ==
The tail is measured from the base to the tip of the longest feathers. Special structures such as racquets or streamers are measured separately. In some cases, the difference between the longest and shortest feathers, that is, the depth of the fork or notch, can also be useful.

== Wing ==
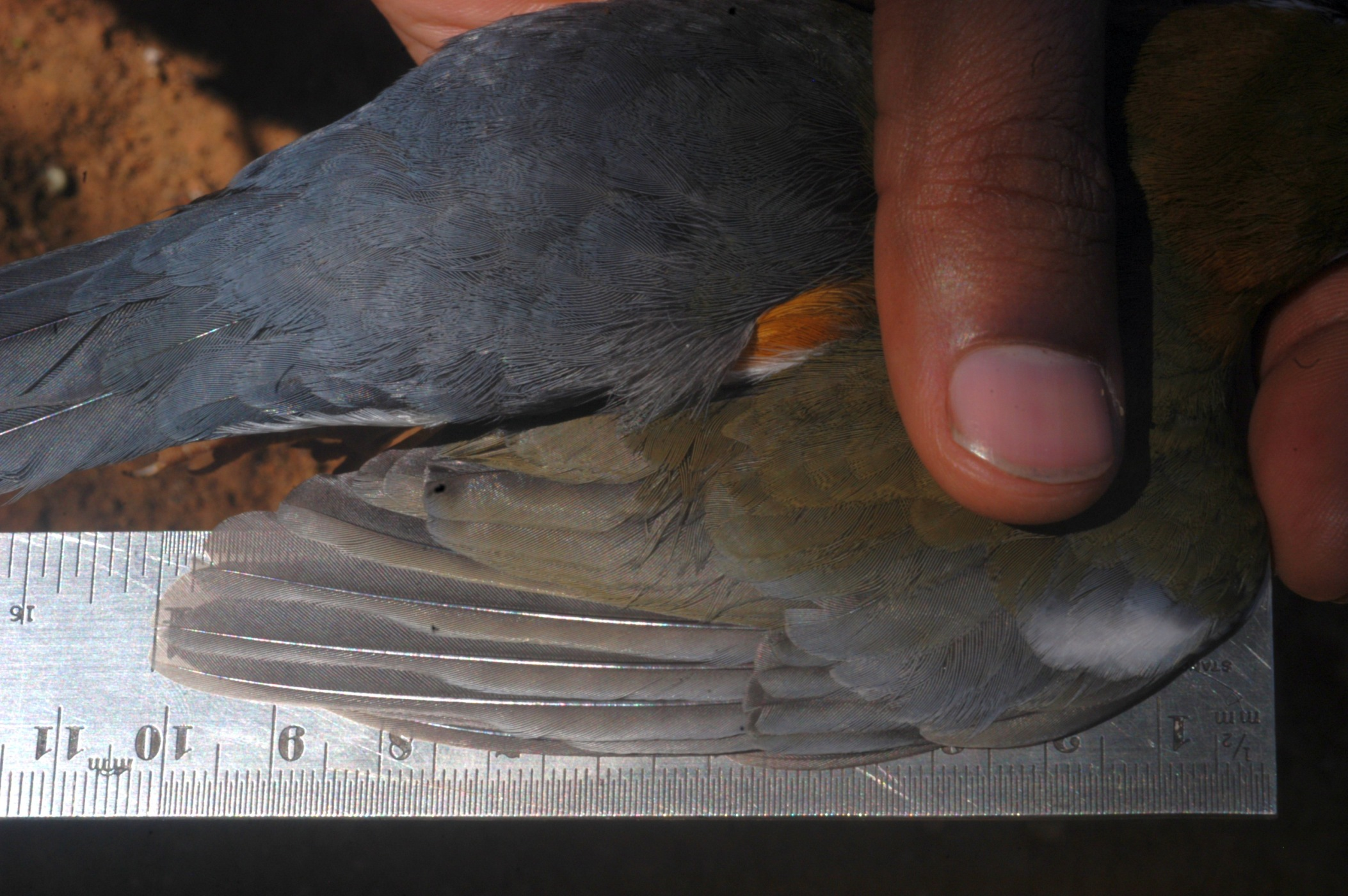
Measuring the wing

The wing is usually measured from the carpal joint (the bend of the wing) to the tip of the longest primary feathers. The wings and feathers may often be flattened to maximize the measure. Still, in many cases, the chord length with natural curvature is preferred. In some cases the relative lengths of the longest primaries and the pattern of size variation among them can be important to measure. The wing width can also be measured from the carpal joint to the tip of the first secondary feather.

== Wingspan ==
The wingspan is the distance between wingtips when the wings are held outstretched. This measurement is difficult to measure in the field with live birds and is prone to variation resulting from wing posture. However, the wingspan is an important dimension in bird flight studies.

== Wing area ==
The area of a single wing can be measured manually by tracing the outline of the wing on grid paper or using a planimeter. Alternatively, the area can be obtained digitally using a photograph of the spread wing that includes a scale and then using image analysis software such as ImageJ. In bird flight aerodynamics, the area of interest is the total wing area, that is, the area of both wings plus the area of the intervening portion of the body known as the "root box". The root box is estimated from a measurement of the wing width at the base (the root chord) and the difference between the wingspan and two times the extent of a single wing. Alternatively, the total wing area can be estimated using the wingspan, wing length, and wing width and assuming simple geometric figures for the shape of the wings.

== Weight ==
The total body weight is an important biological measurement, usually used as a proxy for body mass. However, due to its variability with seasons and body condition, it is not recommended to be used as an indicator of body size. It is, however, useful in quantifying growth in laboratory conditions and for use in clinical diagnostics as an indicator of physiological conditions. It is a fundamental quantity in bird aerodynamics. Birds in captivity are often heavier than wild specimens. Migratory birds gain weight before the migratory period but lose weight during handling or temporary captivity. Dead birds tend to weigh less than in life. The weight can vary by 5 to 10%, even during the day. The male emperor penguin loses 40% of its weight during incubation.
