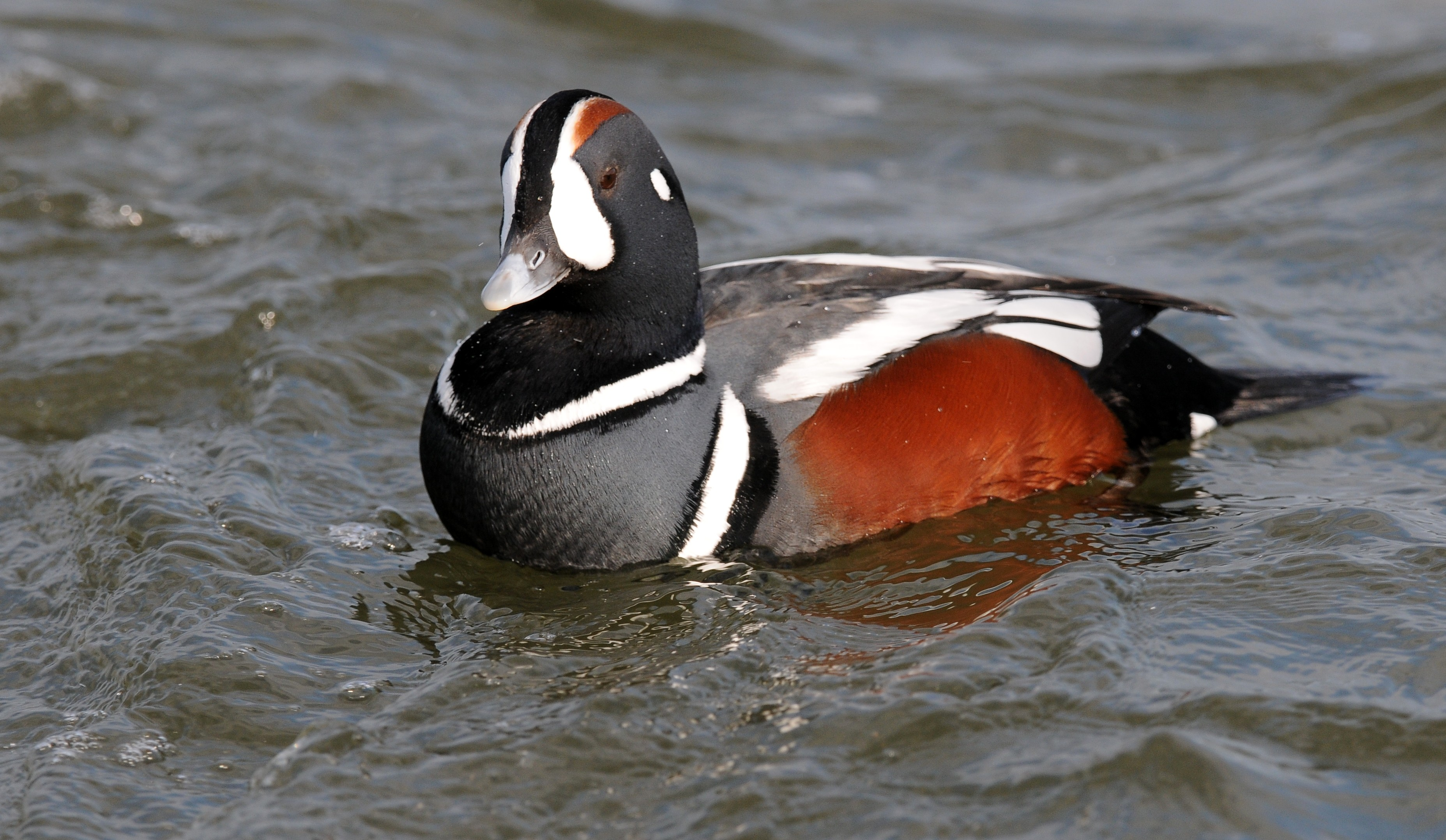
- Harlequin duck, Histrionicus histrionicus (male)

Scientific classification
- Kingdom: Animalia
- Phylum: Chordata
- Class: Aves
- Order: Anseriformes
- Family: Anatidae
- Subfamily: Anatinae
- Tribe: Mergini; Rafinesque, 1815

Genera
- Clangula; Histrionicus; Polysticta; Somateria; Melanitta; Bucephala; Mergellus; Lophodytes; Mergus †Camptorhynchus

= Mergini =

Sea ducks

Tribe of birds

The sea ducks (Mergini) are a tribe of the duck subfamily of birds, the Anatinae. The taxonomy of this group is incomplete. Some authorities separate the group as a subfamily, while others remove some genera. Most species within the group spend their winters near coastal waters. Many species have developed specialized salt glands to allow them to tolerate salt water, but these are poorly developed in juveniles. Some of the species prefer riverine habitats. All but two of the 22 species in this group live in far northern latitudes.

The fish-eating members of this group, such as the mergansers and smew, have serrated edges to their bills to help them grip their prey and are often known as "sawbills". Other sea ducks forage by diving underwater, taking molluscs or crustaceans from the sea floor. The Mergini take on the eclipse plumage during the late summer and molt into their breeding plumage during the winter.

== Species ==
There are twenty-two species in ten genera:

Image	Genus	Living species
	Clangula Leach, 1819	Long-tailed duck (formerly oldsquaw) (Clangula hyemalis)
	Histrionicus Lesson, 1828	Harlequin duck (Histrionicus histrionicus)
	Polysticta Eyton, 1836	Steller's eider (Polysticta stelleri)
	Somateria Leach, 1819	Spectacled eider (Somateria fischeri); Common eider (Somateria mollissima); King eider (Somateria spectabilis)
	Melanitta F. Boie, 1822	Common scoter (Melanitta nigra); Black scoter or American scoter (Melanitta americana) (sometimes considered a subspecies of M. nigra); Velvet scoter (Melanitta fusca); White-winged scoter (Melanitta deglandi) (sometimes considered a subspecies of M. fusca); Stejneger's scoter (Melanitta stejnegeri); Surf scoter (Melanitta perspicillata)
	Bucephala S.F. Baird, 1858	Common goldeneye (Bucephala clangula); Barrow's goldeneye (Bucephala islandica); Bufflehead (Bucephala albeola)
	Mergellus Selby, 1840	Smew (Mergellus albellus)
	Lophodytes Reichenbach, 1853	Hooded merganser (Lophodytes cucullatus)
	Mergus Linnaeus, 1758	Red-breasted merganser (Mergus serrator); †New Zealand merganser (Mergus australis); Common merganser or goosander (Mergus merganser); Brazilian merganser (Mergus octosetaceus); Scaly-sided merganser (Mergus squamatus)
	†Camptorhynchus	†Labrador duck (Camptorhynchus labradorius) (extinct)

Below is a phylogeny based on a mitogenomic study of the placement of the Labrador duck and the diving "goose" Chendytes lawi.

- Mergini
  - - - Clangula hyemalis
      - - Histrionicus histrionicus
        - - - - Polysticta stelleri
              - †Camptorhynchus labradorius
          - - Somateria fischeri
            - - Somateria mollissima
              - Somateria spectabilis
  - - - - Melanitta nigra
        - - Melanitta deglandi
          - Melanitta perspicillata
    - - - - Bucephala albeola
          - - Bucephala clangula
            - Bucephala islandica
      - - - Mergellus albellus
          - - Mergus serrator
            - Lophodytes cucullatus
            - - Mergus merganser
              - - Mergus octosetaceus
                - Mergus squamatus
