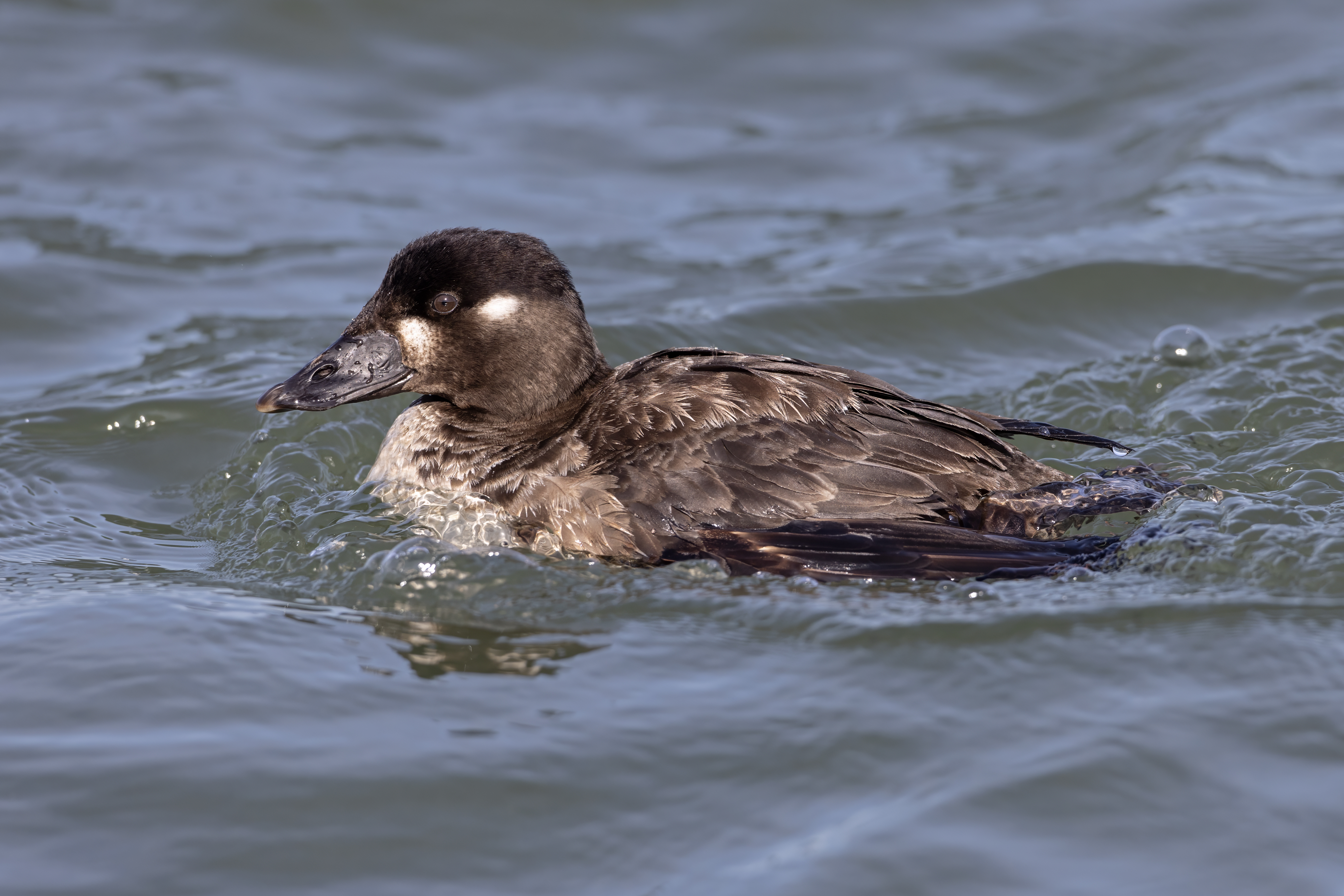
- Adult female

Conservation status
- Least Concern (IUCN 3.1)

Scientific classification
- Kingdom: Animalia
- Phylum: Chordata
- Class: Aves
- Order: Anseriformes
- Family: Anatidae
- Genus: Melanitta
- Subgenus: Melanitta
- Species: M. perspicillata

Binomial name
- Melanitta perspicillata (Linnaeus, 1758)
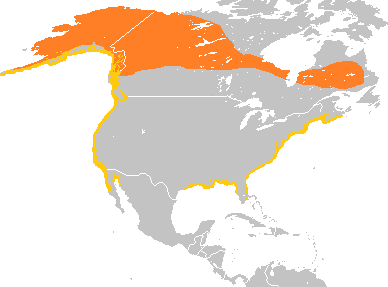
- Range of M. perspicillata Breeding range Wintering range

Synonyms
- Anas perspicillata Linnaeus, 1758

= Surf scoter =

- Adult male

Species of bird

The surf scoter (Melanitta perspicillata) is a large sea duck native to North America. Adult males are almost entirely black with characteristic white patches on the forehead and the nape and adult females are slightly smaller and browner. Surf scoters breed in Northern Canada and Alaska and winter along the Pacific and Atlantic coasts of North America. They are diving ducks and mainly feed on benthic invertebrates, mussels representing an important part of their diet.

== Taxonomy ==
In 1750 the English naturalist George Edwards included an illustration and a description of the surf scoter in the third volume of his A Natural History of Uncommon Birds. He used the English name "The great black duck from Hudson's Bay". Edwards based his hand-coloured etching on a preserved specimen that had been brought to London from the Hudson Bay area of Canada by James Isham. When in 1758 the Swedish naturalist Carl Linnaeus updated his Systema Naturae for the tenth edition, he placed the surf scoter with the ducks and geese in the genus Anas. Linnaeus included a brief description, coined the binomial name Anas perspicillata and cited Edwards' work. The surf scoter is now one of six species placed in the genus Melanitta that was introduced by the German zoologist Friedrich Boie in 1822. The genus name Melanitta combines the Ancient Greek melas meaning "black" and netta meaning "duck". The specific name is from the Modern Latin perspicillatus meaning "spectacled", in turn derived from perspicere "to see through".

A cladistic analysis based on several morphological characters placed the surf scoter as a monotypic taxon, closest to the white-winged scoter (Melanitta deglandi) and the velvet scoter (Melanitta fusca), which are both sister taxa. These three species form the subgenus Melanitta, distinct from the subgenus Oidemia, which contains the black scoter (Melanitta americana) and the common scoter (Melanitta nigra).

The genus Melanitta is part of the Mergini tribe, a monophyletic group of the Northern Hemisphere. It includes eiders, mergansers, goldeneyes and other sea ducks. This tribe is part of the family Anatidae, along with the swans and geese.

== Description ==
The surf scoter reaches sexual maturity after 3 years. The adult male is on average 1,050 g (2.31 lb) and 48 cm (19 in) in length while the adult female averages about 900 g (2.0 lb) and 44 cm (17 in) in length, making this the smallest species of scoter on average. The surf scoter has a wingspan of 29.9–30.3 in (76–77 cm).

The male is completely velvety black except for white patches on the forehead and the nape. It has a swollen bill, appearing orange at a distance but patterned with white, red and yellow, and a black spot near the base. The female is browner than the male, with a fairly uniform plumage, slightly darker above than below. Indistinct paler patches are present on the cheeks below the eye and sometimes a whitish patch is on the nape, a unique trait among scoters. The bill is black with green or blue colorations The juvenile has a plumage similar to the female, but mainly paler and browner, and the breast and belly are whitish.

The surf scoter is easily distinguishable from other scoters by the white patch on the head of the adult male and its unique bill pattern. Females and immatures have a bulkier bill with a squarish base and a more flattened head profile than other scoters. The black and the white-winged scoters are physically very similar to the surf scoter but in flight, the surf scoter is the only one with completely dark wings.

Like all sea ducks, the surf scoter becomes flightless during the simultaneous molt of its flight feathers. This vulnerable period happens usually in late July through early August and lasts for about four weeks. This wing molt is the start of a complete body or prebasic molt which is completed in the fall producing the next basic or breeding plumage. Before the prebasic molt, many duck species undergo a partial prealternate molt replacing the bright colors of the basic plumage of males by the duller alternate or eclipse plumage but the prealternate molt is believed to be limited or absent such that males appear similar in both basic and alternate plumage, but may have a browner belly and duller or "messier" appearance in summer.

The plumage is a good indicator of the age for male surf scoters, but not for females. Second-year males are similar to adults but may have brownish feathers and/or lack the white forehead patch.

=== Vocalization ===
Surf scoters are generally silent and their few vocalizations are poorly known. During courtship display, males perform a gurgling call and an explosive puk-puk. Females defend their young with a crowlike call. When alarmed, surf scoters will often make a sound like a "guk", somewhere between a "cluck" and a "tok", while rapidly surveying their environment or taking to flight en masse.

== Distribution and habitat ==
Compared to most Northern American sea ducks, the surf scoter breeds exclusively in North America, mostly in Northern Canada and Alaska. Then, they take different migration routes to spend the winter in more temperate environments.

While small numbers regularly winter in western Europe as far south as Ireland and Britain, the vast majority of surf scoters winter along the Pacific and Atlantic coasts of North America. The Pacific coast host the highest number of individuals and its large wintering range extends over 5,000 km (3,100 mi), from the Aleutian Islands in Alaska to the Baja Peninsula in Mexico.

This migratory species breeds in the boreal forests near northern freshwater lakes. Very few nests have been observed but they tend to be near spruce cover, slightly upland to wetland areas. To complete its molt before migration, the surf scoter travels to a molting site, which differ from the wintering or the nesting site. Because of the vulnerable state of the ducks in those periods, molting sites are assumed to have profitable food and lower predation risks and they are located in bays, inlets or estuaries. The surf scoter winters in marine habitats near the shore.

=== Migration ===
Many migration routes have been observed, and the route choice of the surf scoter will depend on the latitude of its nesting site. The departure date of the birds may vary according to their wintering site, but the date of arrival and settling on the nesting site appear to be synchronous. This suggest that because of different factors such as the weather or varied foraging conditions, the individuals adjust their migration timing to meet an optimized reproductive schedule. The ducks face very different environmental conditions depending on the location of their wintering grounds, which affect their migratory behavior. Higher proportions of males have been located in the northern part while more females and juveniles winter in the southernmost portion of the range. In spring, males and females migrate together to their breeding area and they usually settle at their nesting sites less than a week after arrival.

== Behavior ==
=== Breeding ===
Surf scoters form pairs on wintering and staging grounds. Most pairs are formed before the arrival on the breeding grounds. Studies showed a strong fidelity in the nesting areas of surf scoters over the years.

The building of the nest usually starts in mid-May to early June and it occurs on the ground close to the sea, lakes or rivers, in woodland or tundra. Females dig a bowl-shaped nest in the ground and lines it with nearby ground debris and down. About 5 to 9 eggs are laid and each may range from 55 to 79 g (1.9–2.8 oz) and average 43.9 mm (1.73 in) in breadth and 62.4 mm (2.46 in) in length.

The incubation lasts for about 28 to 30 days and is provided by the female only. Occasional (and likely accidental) brood mixing between different females occurs in areas with high densities of nests and hatching is synchronous among the eggs. The female usually chooses a feeding area less than 2 meters (6 ft 7 in) deep and protected from strong winds for its offspring. When they reach those food-rich wetland, they begin feeding on their own. The mother abandons its young before they reach the flight age, at about 55 days.

The fledged offspring congregate in small groups on the breeding area before migrating to the wintering grounds, independently of the adults. Studies in Quebec have demonstrated a duckling mortality of 55–65%, probably influenced by the weather conditions shortly after hatching.

=== Diet and foraging ===
The surf scoter mainly feeds on benthic invertebrates. During the breeding period, surf scoters forage in pairs or small groups on a diverse range of freshwater invertebrates. However, the sea ducks feed on marine organisms for the rest of the year, in flocks ranging from a few individuals to several thousands birds. Important foods include crustaceans, herring spawn, gastropods and small bivalves such as mussels.

In late winter and spring, Surf scoters tend to shift their diet according to the relative profitability of the food, showing a level of opportunism. For example, they start feeding in seagrass beds, on epifaunal crustaceans that have increased in size over winter or on Pacific herring eggs (Clupea pallasi), during the fish spawning.

As the prey landscape changes, surf scoters will adjust their foraging effort and habitat selection. Effort is lowest in December, due to high prey abundance, and it increases until mid-February, when prey declines. It increases again in March, probably due to the increasing daylight time for foraging. As the season progresses, surf scoters move to habitats with lower prey declines, instead of staying in habitats poor in prey and increasing their foraging effort.

A surf scoter usually captures its food underwater and consumes it whole. They have been observed to select smaller bivalves than those available, probably because of the energy cost of processing shell matter. They also seem to select slow-swimming epifaunal crustaceans.

Surf scoters consume smaller prey that are located in complex habitat such as mussel beds, which makes them use more visual cues than their congeneric white-winged scoters. They may also visually locate siphons formed by infaunal bivalves to capture them. Gut analysis demonstrated a strong ability to avoid ingesting vegetation while feeding on attached herring eggs.

Flocks of surf scoter appear to dive in a highly synchronous fashion and this synchrony is correlated with the group size. Dive duration vary with many factors such as prey type, density and profitability, season and water depth. Surf scoters increase their dive duration when they are feeding on herring spawning, which are harder to capture than sessile bivalves.

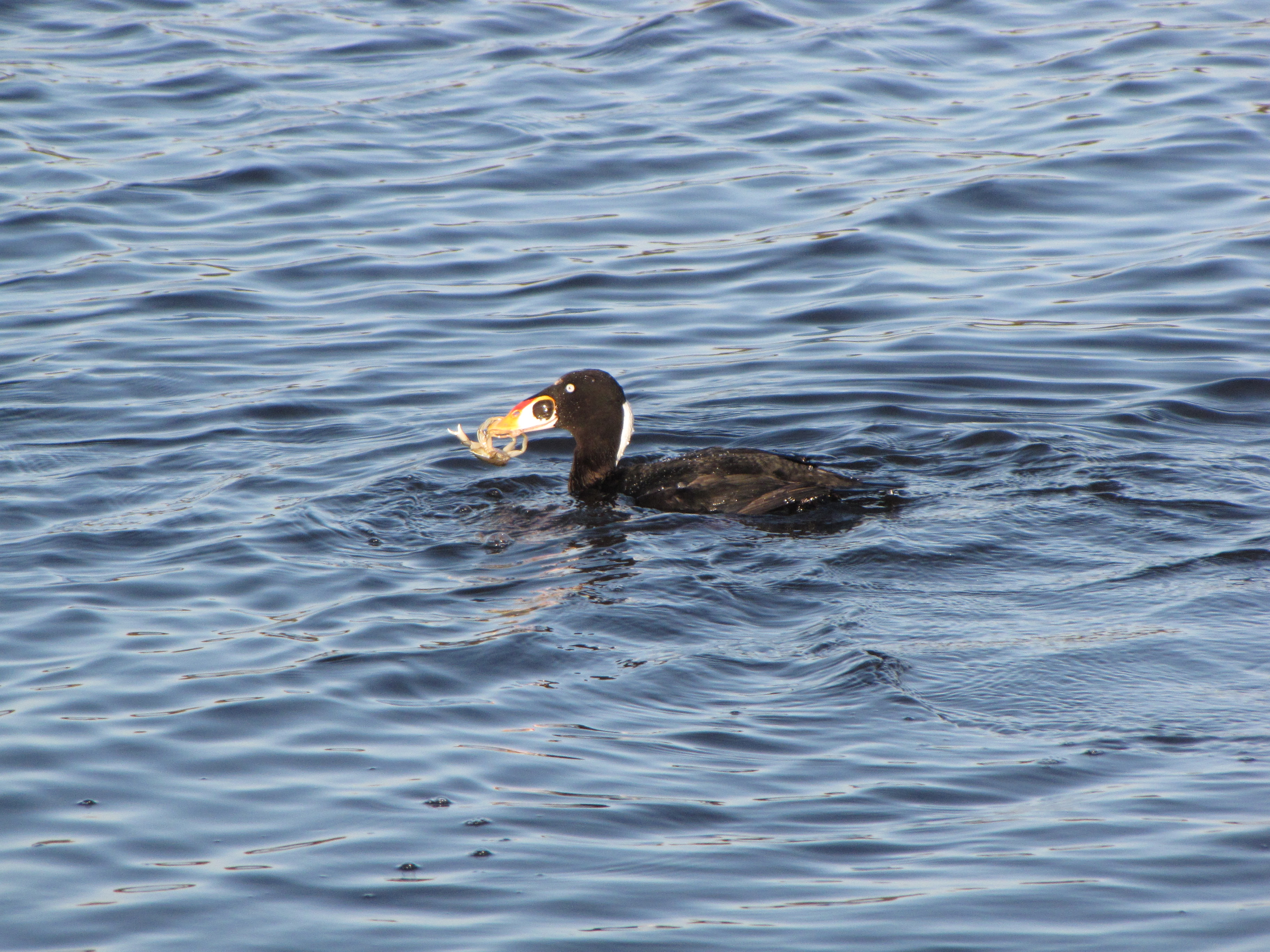
With crab

Adult scoters of this species dive for crustaceans and molluscs, while the ducklings live off any variety of freshwater invertebrates.

=== Threats ===
In a necrotic study on sea ducks, parasitic diseases were an important cause of mortality. The only parasite found in dead surf scoters was the Acanthocephalan Polymorphus spp., which causes peritonitis, an inflammation of the abdomen's lining, and possibly emaciation. Out of 39 studied individuals, seven were fatally affected by this worm. A mortality of about 100 surf scoters was also estimated along the coast of California in the spring of 1995. The other mortality causes included emaciation due to starvation (17 individuals), toxicity from petroleum (3 individuals), and trauma from firearm or collisions in different structures (2 individuals).

Predation of eggs and ducklings have not been studied in detail but bald eagles, golden eagles and mustelids have been identified as the main predators of surf scoters in marine habitats. Marked individuals showed a higher mortality rate in winter than during wing molt.

In November, 2007, an oil spill in San Francisco harbour oiled and killed thousands of birds including many surf scoters. About 40% of the birds affected were from this species. Scientists said that while the species is not endangered it has declined 50–70% over the past 40 years and this spill could decrease populations since most of the affected birds are healthy adults.

== Status ==
The extremely large range and population size of the surf scoter assures it a status of Least Concerned, according to the IUCN. The populations have been apparently decreasing over the last years, but this small decline is not rapid enough to consider moving the species in the Vulnerable category. The global population is estimated to be between 250,000 and 1,300,000 individuals.
