= Orangchon River estuary Important Bird Area =

Nature reserve in North Korea

Coordinates: 41°24′00″N 129°45′00″E

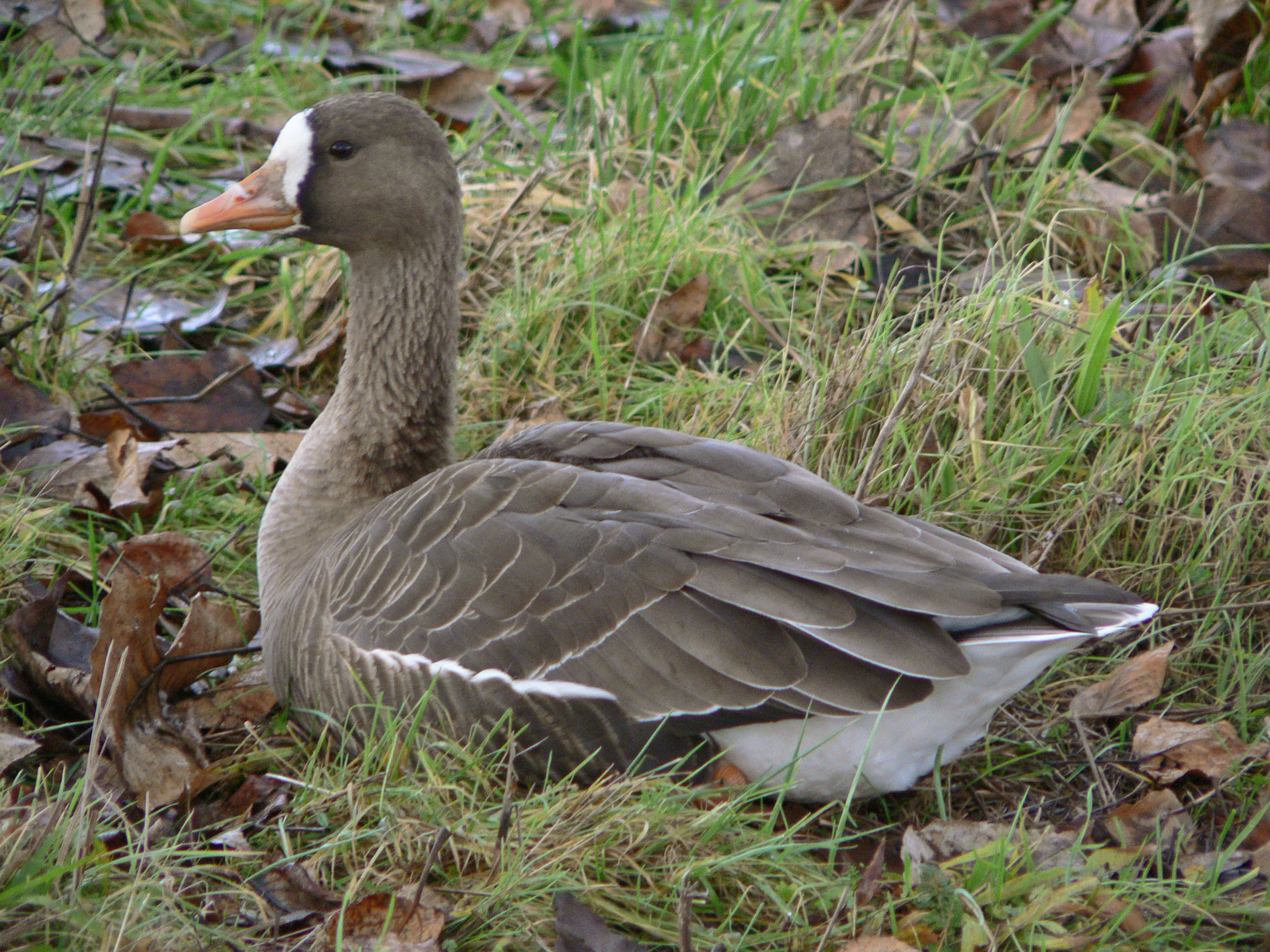
The estuary is an important wintering site for greater white-fronted geese

The Orangchon River estuary Important Bird Area (어랑천) comprises the 2500 ha estuary of the Orangchon River where it flows into the Sea of Japan in North Hamgyong Province on the north-eastern coast of North Korea. . The site has been identified by BirdLife International as an Important Bird Area (IBA) because it supports several waterbird species. Birds for which the site is significant include swan geese, bean geese, greater white-fronted geese, scaly-sided mergansers, white-naped cranes, red-crowned cranes and dunlins. 1500 ha of the site is protected in a nature reserve.
