= Melanitta kirbori =

Melanitta kirbori Temporal range: Early Pleistocene

Scientific classification
- Domain: Eukaryota
- Kingdom: Animalia
- Phylum: Chordata
- Class: Aves
- Order: Anseriformes
- Family: Anatidae
- Genus: Melanitta
- Species: †M. kirbori

Binomial name
- †Melanitta kirbori Zelenkov, 2024

Extinct species of Melanitta

Melanitta kirbori is an extinct species of Melanitta that lived in the Crimean Peninsula during the Early Pleistocene.
