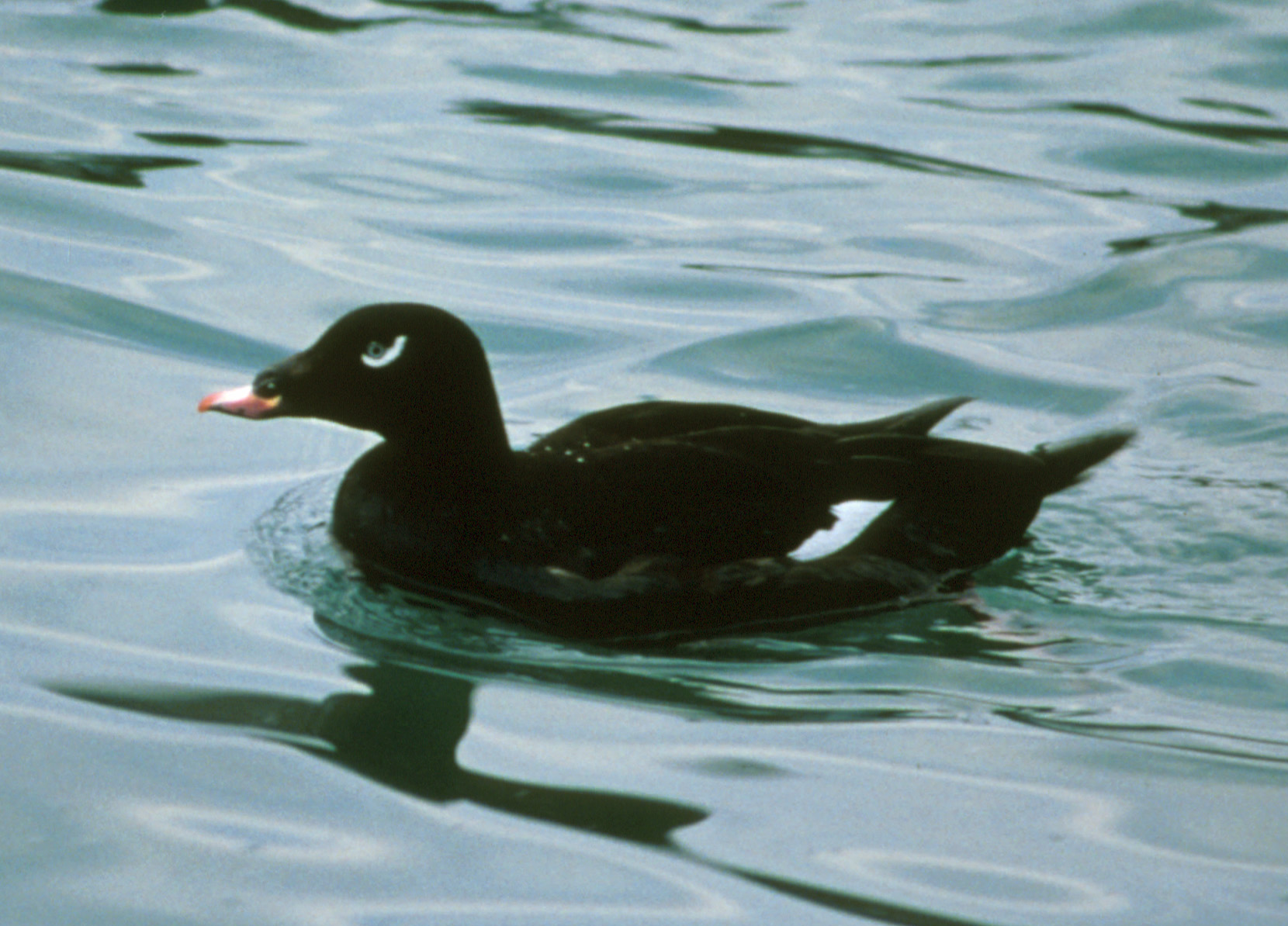
- Adult male white-winged scoter (Melanitta deglandi)

Scientific classification
- Kingdom: Animalia
- Phylum: Chordata
- Class: Aves
- Order: Anseriformes
- Family: Anatidae
- Subfamily: Merginae
- Genus: Melanitta; F. Boie, 1822

Type species
- Anas fusca (velvet scoter) Linnaeus, 1758

Species
- See text

Synonyms
- Oidemia

= Scoter =

Scoters

Genus of ducks

The scoters are stocky seaducks in the genus Melanitta. The drakes are mostly black and have swollen bills, the females are brown. They breed in the far north of Europe, Asia, and North America, and winter further south in temperate zones of those continents. They form large flocks on suitable coastal waters. These are tightly packed, and the birds tend to take off together. Their lined nests are built on the ground close to the sea, lakes or rivers, in woodland or tundra. These species dive for crustaceans and molluscs.

== Taxonomy ==
The genus Melanitta was introduced by the German zoologist Friedrich Boie in 1822. The type species was designated in 1838 as the velvet scoter by Thomas Campbell Eyton. The genus name combines the Ancient Greek melas meaning "black" and netta meaning "duck".

The genus contains six species:

Genus Melanitta – F. Boie, 1822 – six species
Common name	Scientific name and subspecies	Range	Size and ecology	IUCN status and estimated population
Black or American scoter Male Female	Melanitta americana (Swainson, 1832)	North of North America in Labrador and Newfoundland to the southeast Hudson Bay	Size: Habitat: Diet:	LC
Common scoter Male Female	Melanitta nigra (Linnaeus, 1758)	North of Europe and Asia east to the Olenyok River	Size: Habitat: Diet:	LC
Velvet scoter Male Female	Melanitta fusca (Linnaeus, 1758)	Eastern Turkey, Europe as far south as Great Britain, and on the Black and Caspian Sea	Size: Habitat: Diet:	VU
White-winged scoter Male Female	Melanitta deglandi (Bonaparte, 1850)	North America	Size: Habitat: Diet:	LC
Stejneger's scoter Male	Melanitta stejnegeri (Ridgway, 1887)	Far north of Asia east of the Yenisey Basin	Size: Habitat: Diet:	LC
Surf scoter Male Female	Melanitta perspicillata (Linnaeus, 1758)	North America, mostly in Northern Canada and Alaska	Size: Habitat: Diet:	LC

A fossil species, Melanitta kirbori, is known from the Early Pleistocene of Crimea. The presumed fossil "scoter" Melanitta ceruttii, which lived in California during the Late Pliocene, is now placed in the genus Histrionicus.
