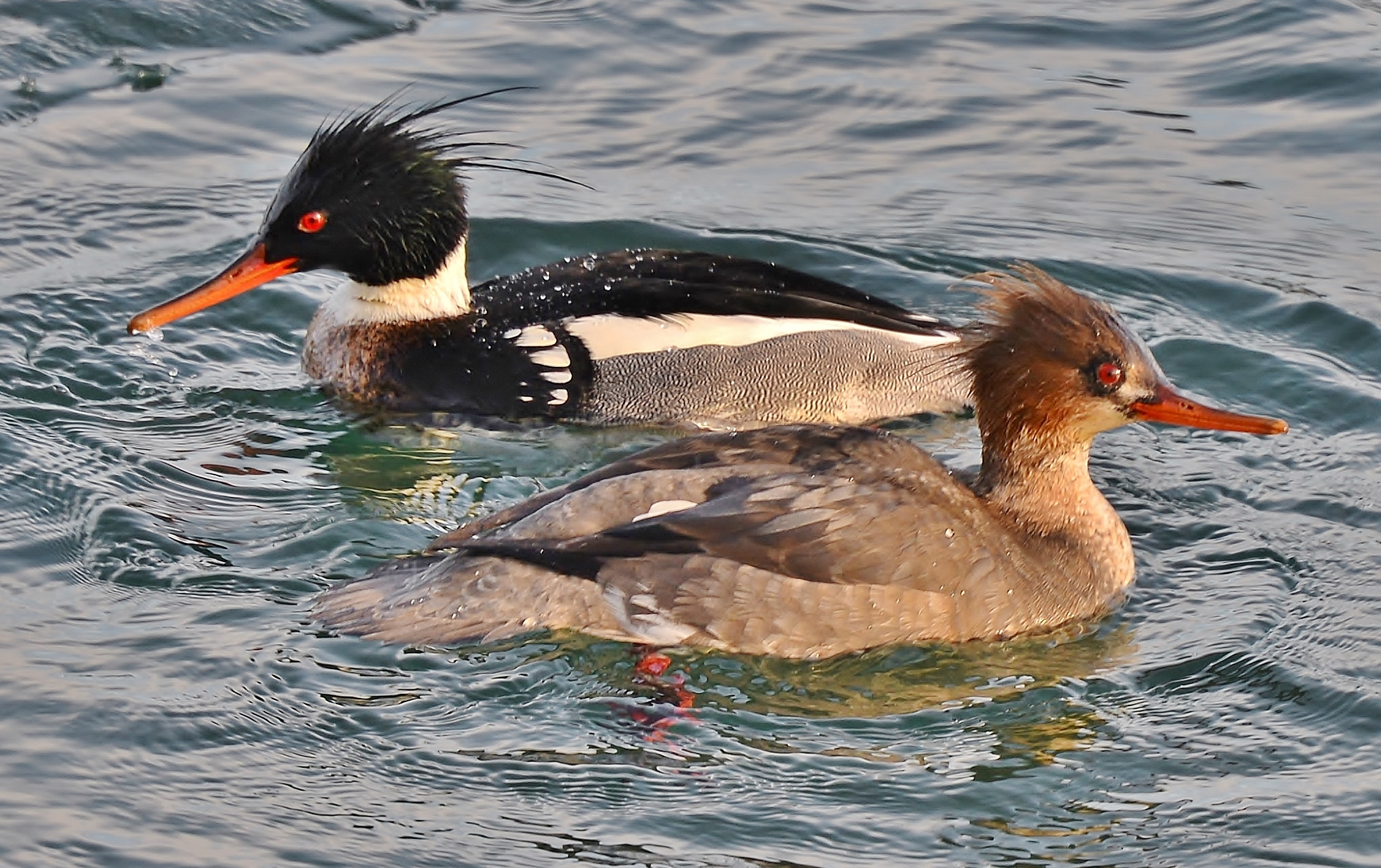
- Red-breasted merganser (Mergus serrator)

Scientific classification
- Kingdom: Animalia
- Phylum: Chordata
- Class: Aves
- Order: Anseriformes
- Family: Anatidae
- Subfamily: Anatinae
- Genus: Mergus; Linnaeus, 1758

Type species
- Mergus serrator Linnaeus, 1758

Species
- †Mergus australis Auckland Island merganser Mergus merganser Common merganser †Mergus milleneri Chatham merganser Mergus octosetaceus Brazilian merganser Mergus serrator Red-breasted merganser Mergus squamatus Scaly-sided merganser

= Mergus =

Typical mergansers

Genus of birds

Mergus is the genus containing the typical mergansers (/mɜːrˈɡænsərz/ mur-GAN-sərz), fish-eating ducks in the subfamily Anatinae.

The common merganser or goosander (Mergus merganser) and red-breasted merganser (M. serrator) have broad ranges in the northern hemisphere. The Brazilian merganser (M. octosetaceus) is a South American duck, and one of the six most threatened waterfowl in the world, with possibly fewer than 250 birds in the wild. The scaly-sided merganser or "Chinese merganser" (M. squamatus) is also an endangered species; it lives in temperate eastern Asia, breeding in the northeast and wintering further south.

The hooded merganser (Lophodytes cucullatus, formerly known as Mergus cucullatus) is not currently included in this genus but is closely related, and may be embedded within it. The other "aberrant" merganser, the smew (Mergellus albellus), previously thought to be closer to goldeneyes (Bucephala) due to the occurrence of natural hybrids, is now known to be basal to all the other mergansers from genetic analysis.

Although they are seaducks, most of the mergansers prefer riverine habitats, with only the red-breasted merganser being common at sea. These large fish-eating ducks typically have black-and-white or brown, and with bottle-green heads in the male plumage, while the females are largely grey or brownish and with brown heads; both sexes have somewhat shaggy crests. All have serrated edges to their long and thin bills that help them grip their prey. Along with the smew and hooded merganser, they are therefore often known as "sawbills". The goldeneyes, on the other hand, feed mainly on mollusks, and therefore have a more typical duck-bill.

Mergus ducks are also classified as "diving ducks" because they submerge completely in looking for food. In other traits, however, the genera Mergus, Lophodytes, Mergellus, and Bucephala are very similar; uniquely among all Anseriformes, they do not have notches at the hind margin of their sternum, but holes surrounded by bone.

== Taxonomy ==
The genus Mergus was introduced in 1758 by the Swedish naturalist Carl Linnaeus in the tenth edition of his Systema Naturae. The genus name is the Latin word for an unidentified waterbird mentioned by Pliny the Elder and other authors; some sources have identified the original mergus as referring to either a cormorant or Scopoli's shearwater. The type species was designated as Mergus serrator Linnaeus, 1758 (the red-breasted merganser) by Thomas Campbell Eyton in 1838.

== Etymology ==
The genus name is a Latin word used by Pliny the Elder and other Roman authors to refer to an unspecified diving waterbird.

The English name merganser, first used in Mediaeval Latin by Conrad Gesner in 1555, and as an English loan word in 1752, means "diving goose", from merg (as in "submerge"), + Anser. The name goosander is older in English usage, first attested in 1622 with the spelling "gossander" and 1674 with its current spelling; it is of unknown etymology but possibly from a Scandinavian origin as "gossand", where goss is unknown, and -and is a duck.

== Recent species ==
The genus contains four living species and two recently extinct species.

Genus Mergus – Linnaeus, 1758 – four species
Common name	Scientific name and subspecies	Range	Size and ecology	IUCN status and estimated population
Common merganser Goosander Male Female	Mergus merganser Linnaeus, 1758 Three subspecies: M. m. merganser Linnaeus, 1758 (goosander; northern Eurasia); M. m. orientalis Gould, 1845 (Tibetan goosander; Tibetan Plateau); M. m. americanus Cassin, 1852 (common merganser; North America)	Europe, northern and central Asia, and North America	Size: 58–72 cm Habitat: Lakes and rivers; sometimes coastal estuaries when moulting in late summer, and in winter Diet: Small fish	LC
Brazilian merganser Sexes similar	Mergus octosetaceus Vieillot, 1817	Brazil	Size: 49–51 cm Habitat: Small fast-flowing rivers in forests Diet: Small fish	CR
Red-breasted merganser Male Female	Mergus serrator Linnaeus, 1758	Northern North America, Greenland, Europe, and Asia	Size: 52–58 cm Habitat: Coastal or inland lakes in summer, coastal in winter Diet: Small fish	LC
Scaly-sided merganser Male Female	Mergus squamatus Gould, 1864	East Asia	Size: 52–62 cm Habitat: Small fast-flowing rivers in forests in summer, larger rivers in winter, rarely on lakes Diet: Small fish	EN

Image	Scientific name	Common name	Distribution
	†Mergus australis	Auckland Island merganser	Auckland Islands, New Zealand (extinct c. 1902). The species identity of merganser bones from mainland New Zealand (North, South, and Stewart Islands) is unresolved.
	†Mergus milleneri	Chatham Island merganser	Chatham Island, New Zealand. Extinct sometime after human settlement of the Chatham Islands, which began c. 1500.

=== Fossil species ===
Some fossil members of this genus have been described:

- Mergus miscellus is known from the Middle Miocene Calvert Formation (Barstovian, c. 14 million years ago) of Virginia, USA.
- Mergus connectens lived in the Early Pleistocene about 2–1 million years ago, in Central and Eastern Europe.

The Early Oligocene booby "Sula" ronzoni was at first mistakenly believed to be a typical merganser. A Late Serravallian (13–12 million years ago) fossil sometimes attributed to Mergus, found in the Sajóvölgyi Formation of Mátraszőlős, Hungary, probably belongs to Mergellus. The affiliations of "Anas" albae from the Messinian (c. 7–5 million years ago) of Hungary are undetermined; it was initially believed to be a typical merganser too.
