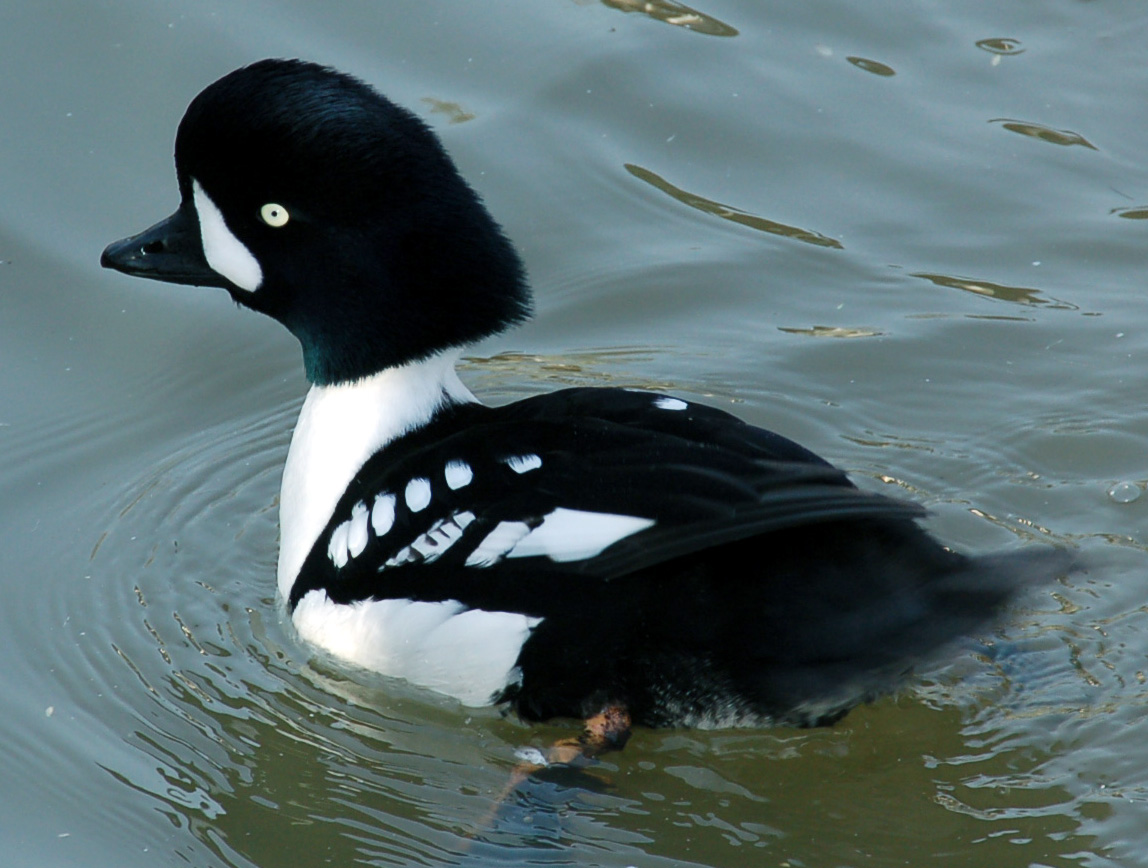
- Male
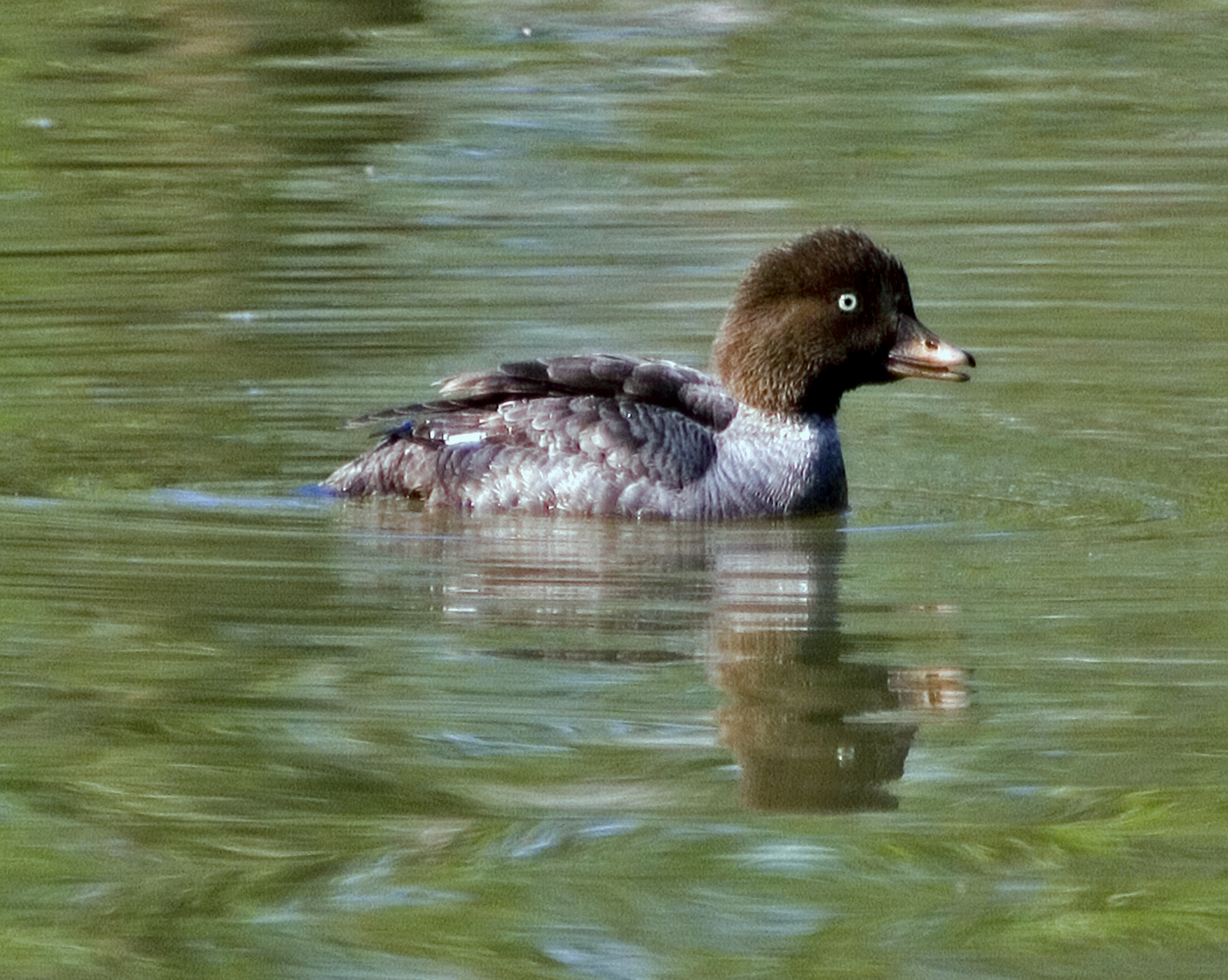
- Immature, female

Conservation status
- Least Concern (IUCN 3.1)

Scientific classification
- Kingdom: Animalia
- Phylum: Chordata
- Class: Aves
- Order: Anseriformes
- Family: Anatidae
- Genus: Bucephala
- Species: B. islandica

Binomial name
- Bucephala islandica (Gmelin, JF, 1789)

= Barrow's goldeneye =

Species of bird

Barrow's goldeneye (Bucephala islandica) is a medium-sized sea duck of the genus Bucephala, the goldeneyes. This bird was named after Sir John Barrow. The genus name is derived from Ancient Greek boukephalos, "bullheaded", from bous, "bull" and kephale, "head", a reference to the bulbous head shape of the bufflehead. The species name islandica means Iceland.

== Taxonomy ==
Barrow's goldeneye was formally described in 1789 by the German naturalist Johann Friedrich Gmelin in his revised and expanded edition of Carl Linnaeus's Systema Naturae. He placed it with the ducks, geese and swans in the genus Anas and coined the binomial name Anas islandica. Gmelin based his description on the "Hravn Oend" that had been briefly described in 1776 by Danish naturalist Otto Friedrich Müller. Barrow's goldeneye is now placed with the common goldeneye and the bufflehead in the genus Bucephala that was introduced in 1858 by American naturalist Spencer Baird. The genus name is derived from Ancient Greek boukephalos, meaning "bullheaded", from bous "bull", and kephale, "head". The specific epithet islandica is for Iceland. The species is monotypic: no subspecies are recognised.

== Description ==
Adults are similar in appearance to the common goldeneye. On average, adult males are 49 cm (19.2 in) long and weigh 0.97 kg (2.13 lb); females are typically 43 cm (17 in) long and weigh 0.59 kg (1.31 lb). The Barrow's goldeneye has a wingspan of 70–73 cm (28–29 in). Adult males have a dark head with a purplish gloss and a white crescent at the front of the face. Adult females have a mostly yellow bill. The male Barrow's goldeneye differs from the male common goldeneye in the fact that the common goldeneye has a round white patches on the face, less black on the back of the bird, a greenish gloss, and a larger bill. For the females, the common goldeneye has a less rounded head, and a bill in which only the tip is yellow.

=== Vocalizations ===
The Barrow's goldeneye is a relatively quiet bird that generally only makes vocalizations during the breeding season and courtship. These can include low volume squeaks, grunts and croaks. During flights, the fast movement of the bird's wings creates a low whistling sound.

== Distribution and habitat ==
Their breeding habitat consists of wooded lakes and ponds primarily in northwestern North America, but also in scattered locations in eastern Canada and Iceland. Females return to the same breeding sites year after year and also tend to use the same nesting sites. The males stay with their mate through the winter and defend their territory during the breeding season, then leave for the molting site. Mating pairs often stay intact even though the male and female are apart for long periods of time over the summer during molting times. The pair then reunites at wintering areas.

In Iceland the bird is known as húsönd (house-duck); it is a common species of the Lake Mývatn in the north of the country.

There have been three records of vagrants from Scotland, the only records of this species accepted as wild in Europe outside of Iceland.

== Behavior ==
They are migratory and most winter in protected coastal waters or open inland waters. Barrow's goldeneye, along with many other species of sea ducks, rely on urbanized, coastal estuaries as important places on their migration patterns. These estuaries provide excellent wintering and stopping places during the ducks' migration. It is an extremely rare vagrant to western Europe and to southern North America.

These diving birds forage underwater. They eat aquatic insects, crustaceans and pond vegetation. The main staples of the bird's diet are Gammarus oceanicus and Calliopius laeviusculus, which are both marine crustaceans. A large part of their diet consists of mussels and gastropods.

The Barrow's goldeneye is considered an arboreal bird species because much of its nesting is done in cavities found in mature trees. The birds will also nest in burrows or protected sites on the ground. Barrow's goldeneyes tend not to share habitat with the much more numerous common goldeneye. Barrow's goldeneye tend to be territorial towards other birds venturing into their domain. This is especially true among the drakes. Confrontations may occur in the form of fighting. Drakes often do a form of territorial display along the boundaries of their territory. This is both true on land and in the water. These territorial displays average about 6 minutes in length and often trigger other males to perform their own show.

=== Breeding ===
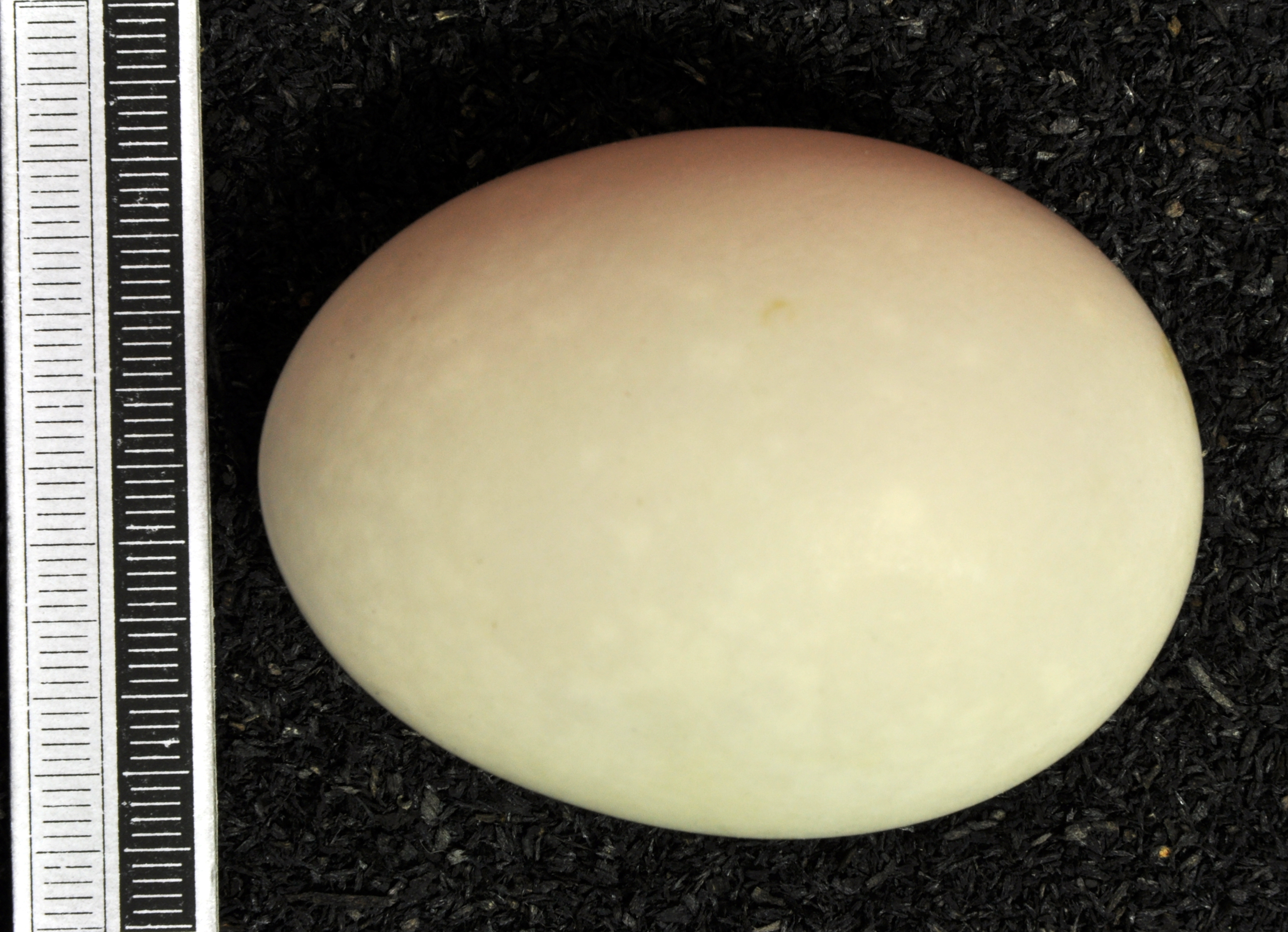
Egg, Collection Museum Wiesbaden

The female selects a nest cavity and does all the nest maintenance. 6–12 eggs are laid per clutch, each measuring 5.7–7 cm (2.–2.8 in) in length and 3.96–4.72 cm (1.6–1.9 in) in width.

After the breeding season, the birds migrate to specific molting sites to undergo molting, the loss and regeneration of feathers which causes them to be flightless for anywhere from 20–40 days. These molting sites are often wetlands that are more drought resistant and plentiful in food, along with being less influenced by humans and predators.

== 1989 Exxon Valdez oil spill ==
The Barrow's goldeneye was greatly affected by the Exxon Valdez oil spill in 1989. The spill greatly impacted the bird's wintering areas, and numbers of the birds in these areas decreased after the spill. The birds' exposure to the oil spill mainly occurred in the shallow water mussel beds along the coast.

== Gallery ==
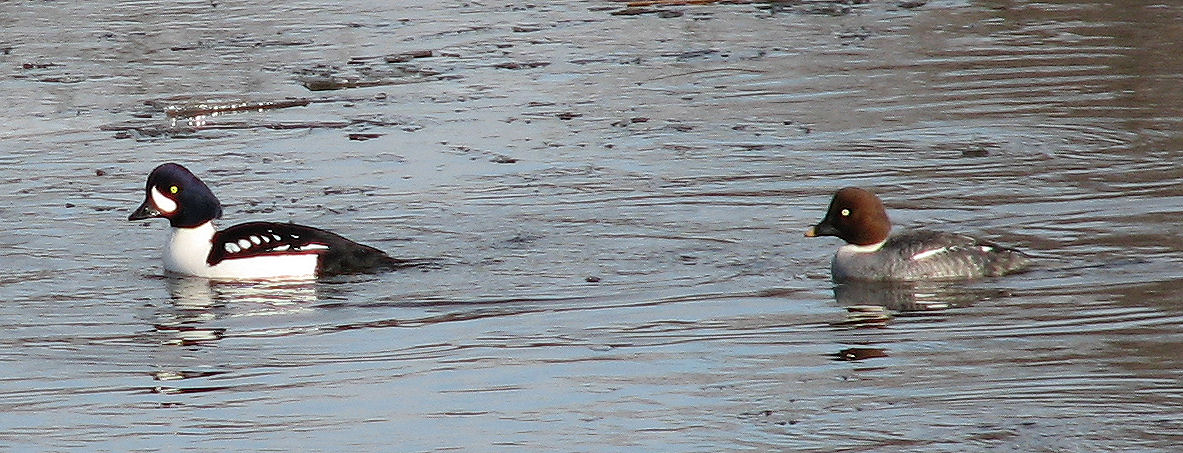
Male and female goldeneye, Rideau River, Ottawa

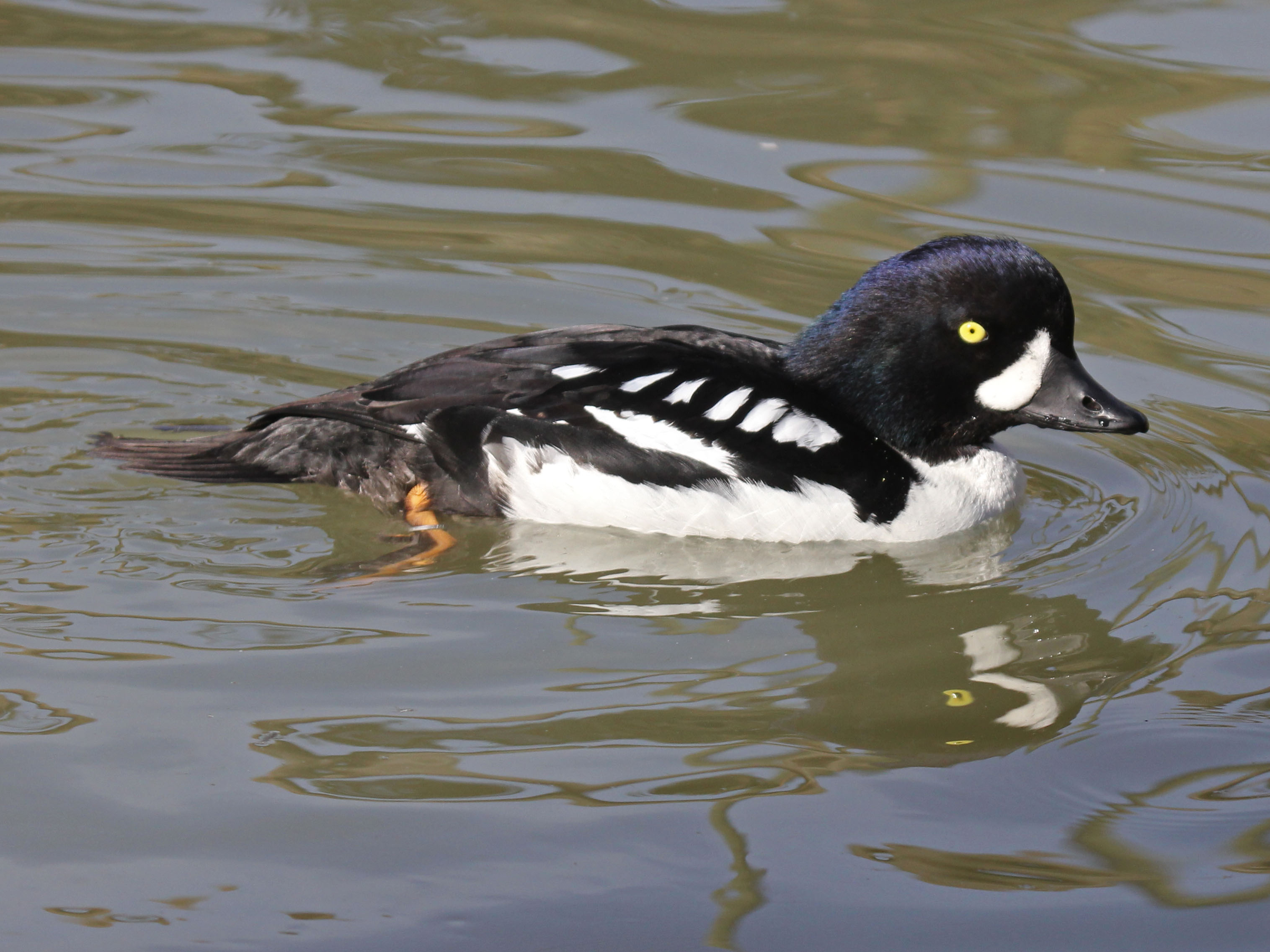
Male

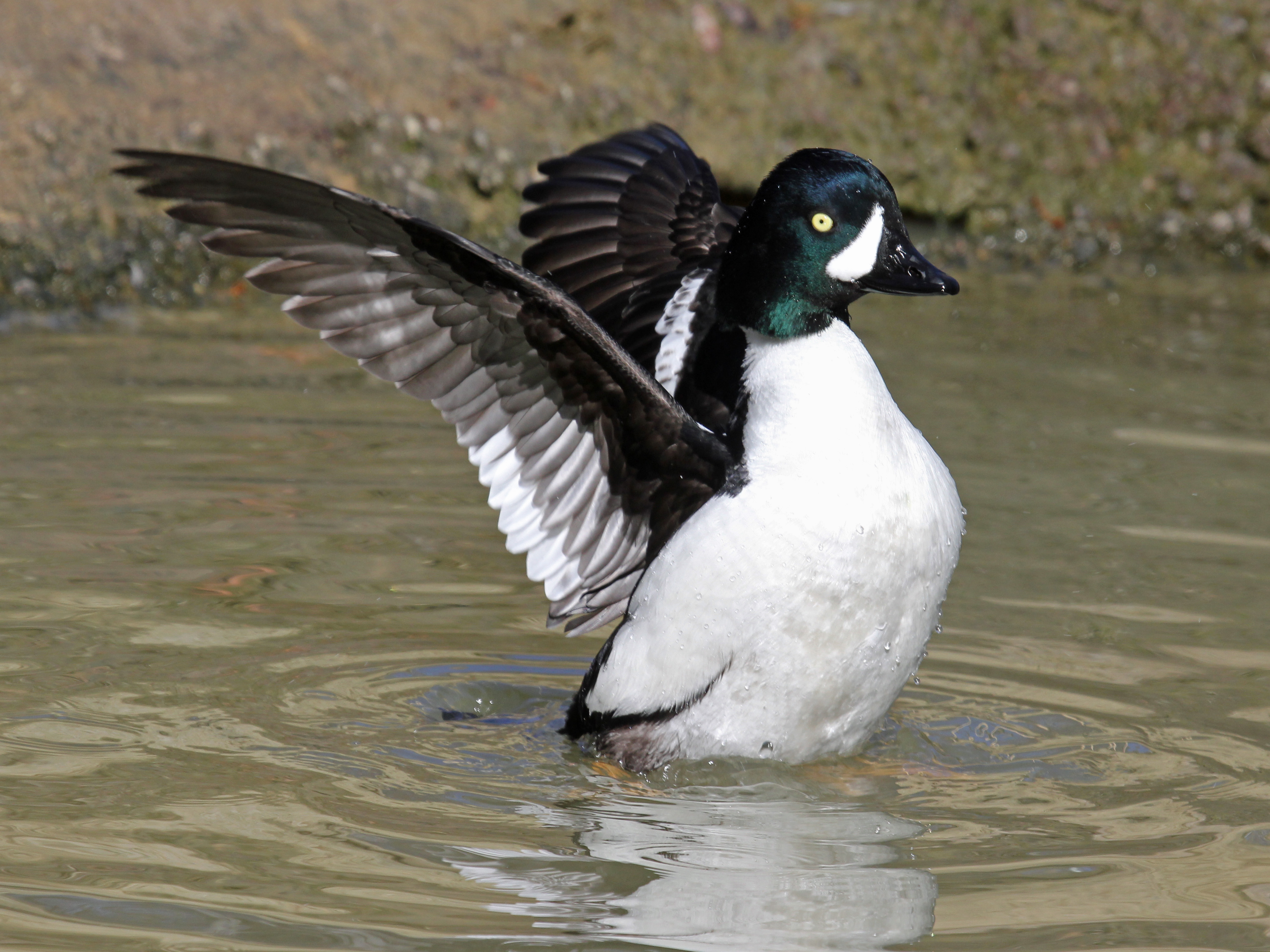
Male

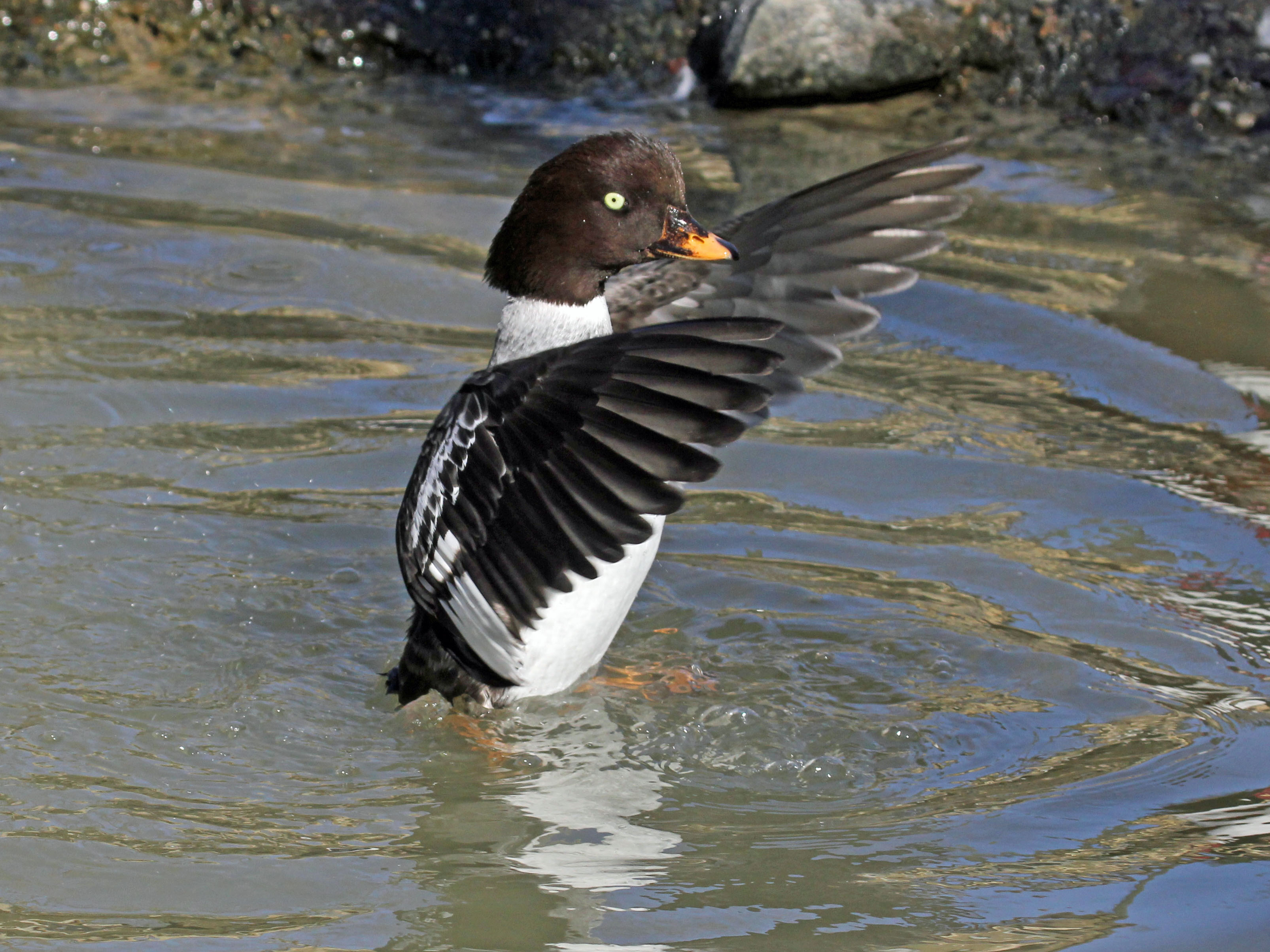
Female
