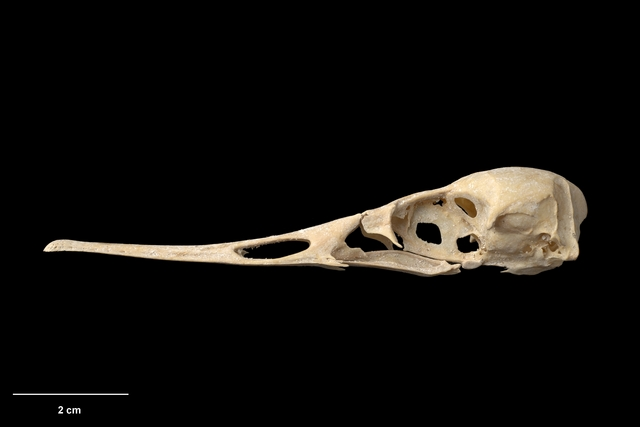
- Type specimen from the collections of Te Papa

Conservation status
- Extinct (NZ TCS)

Scientific classification
- Kingdom: Animalia
- Phylum: Chordata
- Class: Aves
- Order: Anseriformes
- Family: Anatidae
- Genus: Mergus
- Species: †M. milleneri

Binomial name
- †Mergus milleneri Williams & Tennyson, 2014

= Chatham Island merganser =

Chatham Island merganser Temporal range: Late Pleistocene-Holocene

Extinct species of bird

The Chatham Island merganser (Mergus milleneri) is an extinct species of merganser duck from New Zealand.

== Taxonomy ==
The binomial name refers to Dr. Philip Millener, a former curator of fossil birds at New Zealand's national museum, to recognize his work in collecting material on the species.

== Description ==
The Chatham merganser is known only from subfossils, so not much is known about the bird. It was the smallest of all Mergus species. It had a smaller skull and beak than the Auckland Island merganser, but had larger salt glands. Most bones of the species were 3-6% smaller than those of the Auckland Island merganser. They had a lesser flying ability compared to most other Mergus species but were still capable of flight.

== Distribution and habitat ==
Fossil records indicate it was widespread on Chatham Island but either not found, or not abundant, on the smaller nearby islands. Suitable habitat on Chatham Island would have included small lakes, slow peat-stained rivers, and a lagoon.

== Behaviour ==
=== Nesting ===
Remains of adults, eggs, and nestlings have been found in a small cave on the shoreline of the Te Whanga Lagoon, indicating that this cave was used as a popular nesting site.

== History ==
The species was described formally in 2014, the species was previously considered to be the same species as the Auckland Island merganser.

== Extinction ==
One of the causes of extinction for the species was likely human hunting, indicated by the presence of its bones in prehistoric human food middens. Other possible causes of its extinction include habitat destruction and introduced predators like the Polynesian rat and Polynesian dog.
