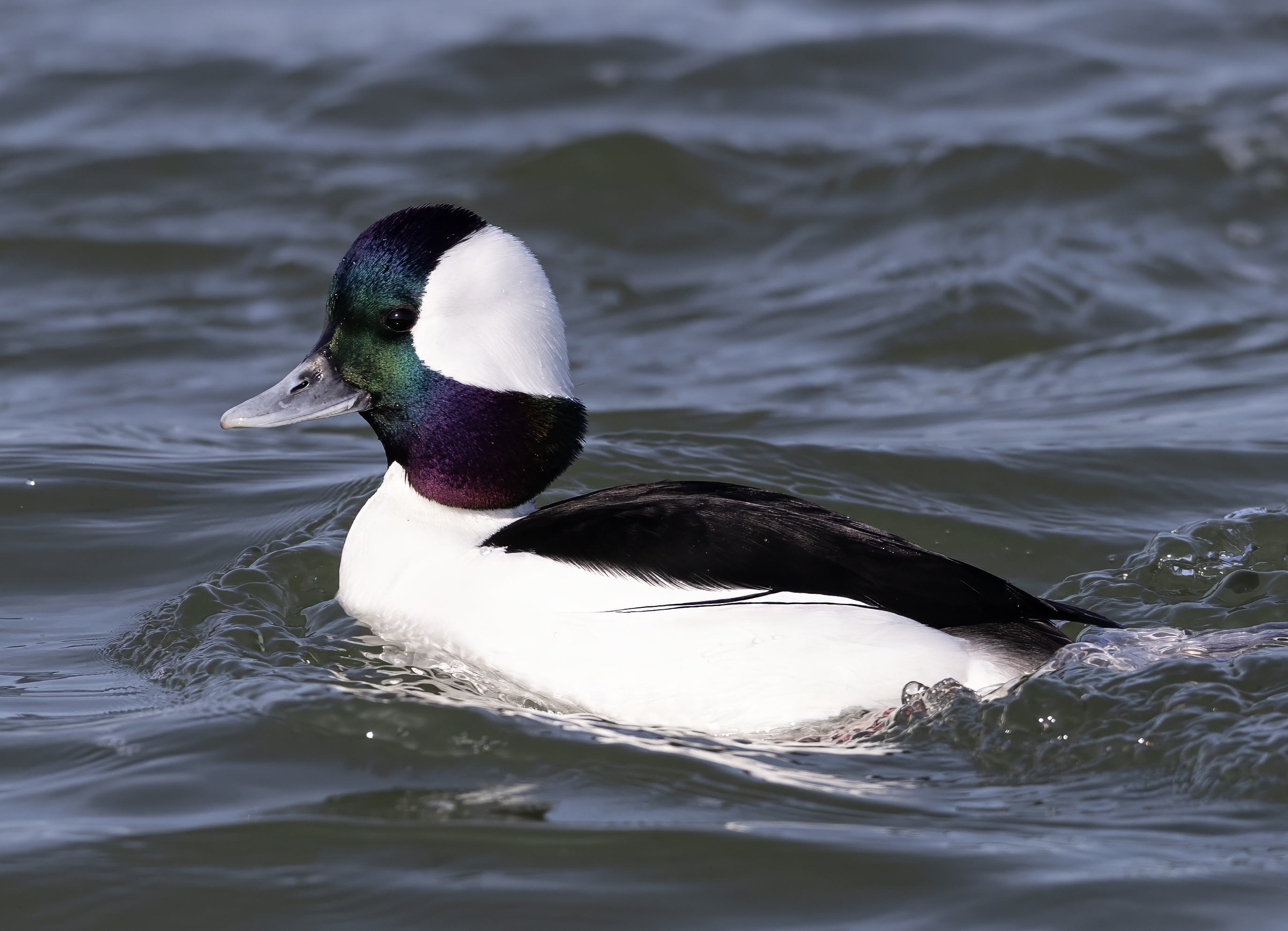
- Male
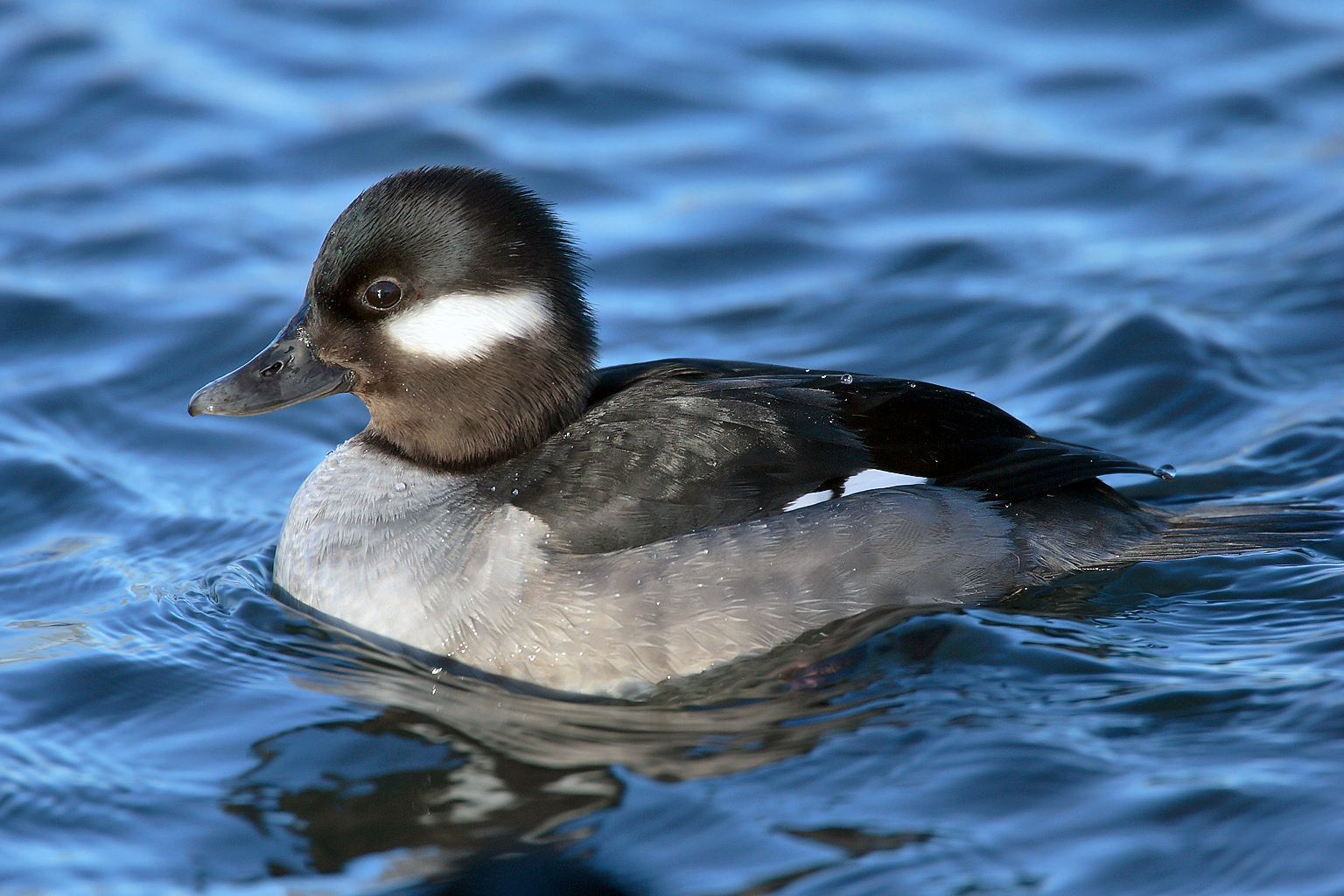
- Female

Conservation status
- Least Concern (IUCN 3.1)

Scientific classification
- Kingdom: Animalia
- Phylum: Chordata
- Class: Aves
- Order: Anseriformes
- Family: Anatidae
- Genus: Bucephala
- Species: B. albeola

Binomial name
- Bucephala albeola (Linnaeus, 1758)
- Breeding Migration Year-round Nonbreeding

Synonyms
- Anas albeola Linnaeus, 1758; Charitonetta albeola (Linnaeus, 1758)

= Bufflehead =

Species of bird

The bufflehead (Bucephala albeola) is a small sea duck of the genus Bucephala, the goldeneyes. It breeds in Alaska and Canada and migrates in winter to southern North America. This species was first described by Carl Linnaeus in his landmark 1758 10th edition of Systema Naturae as Anas albeola.

== Taxonomy ==
The bufflehead was formally described in 1758 by the Swedish naturalist Carl Linnaeus in the tenth edition of his Systema Naturae under the binomial name Anas albeola. Linnaeus based his account on the "little black and white duck" that had been described in 1747 by the English naturalist George Edwards in the second volume of his A Natural History of Uncommon Birds. Edwards examined a specimen from Newfoundland provided by the archivist George Holmes, the deputy Keeper of Records in the Tower of London. Linnaeus specified the type locality as America, but this has been restricted to Newfoundland following Edwards. The bufflehead is now placed with two goldeneye species in the genus Bucephala that was introduced in 1858 by the American naturalist Spencer Baird. The genus name is derived from Ancient Greek βουκέφαλος bouképhalos, 'bullheaded', from boûs 'bull', and kephalḗ, 'head', a reference to the oddly bulbous head shape of the species. The species name albeola is a diminutive of Latin albus meaning 'white'.

The modern species is monotypic: no subspecies are recognised. The extinct subspecies Bucephala albeola fossilis from the Late Pleistocene of California was originally described as a distinct extinct species, but is now considered to belong within the Bufflehead.

== Description ==
The bufflehead ranges from 32–40 cm (13–16 in) long and weighs 270–550 g (9.5–19.4 oz), with the drakes larger than the females. Averaging 35.5 cm (14.0 in) and 370 g (13 oz), it rivals the green-winged teal as the smallest American duck. The bufflehead has a wingspan of 21.6 in (55 cm).

Adult males are striking black and white, with iridescent green and purple heads and a large white patch behind the eye. Females are grey-toned with a smaller white patch behind the eye and a light underside.

== Distribution and habitat ==
They are migratory and most of them winter in protected coastal waters, or open inland waters, on the east and west coasts of North America and the southern United States. They can also be observed wintering on the Great Lakes. The bufflehead is an extremely rare vagrant to western Europe and an occasional vagrant to the Caribbean with records from Cuba, the Bahamas, Jamaica, Puerto Rico, United States Virgin Islands, Saint Martin, and Curaçao. Their breeding habitat is wooded lakes and ponds in Alaska and Canada, almost entirely included in the boreal forest or taiga habitat. From 1966 to 2015, the bufflehead experienced a >1.5% yearly population increase throughout its breeding range.

== Behavior ==
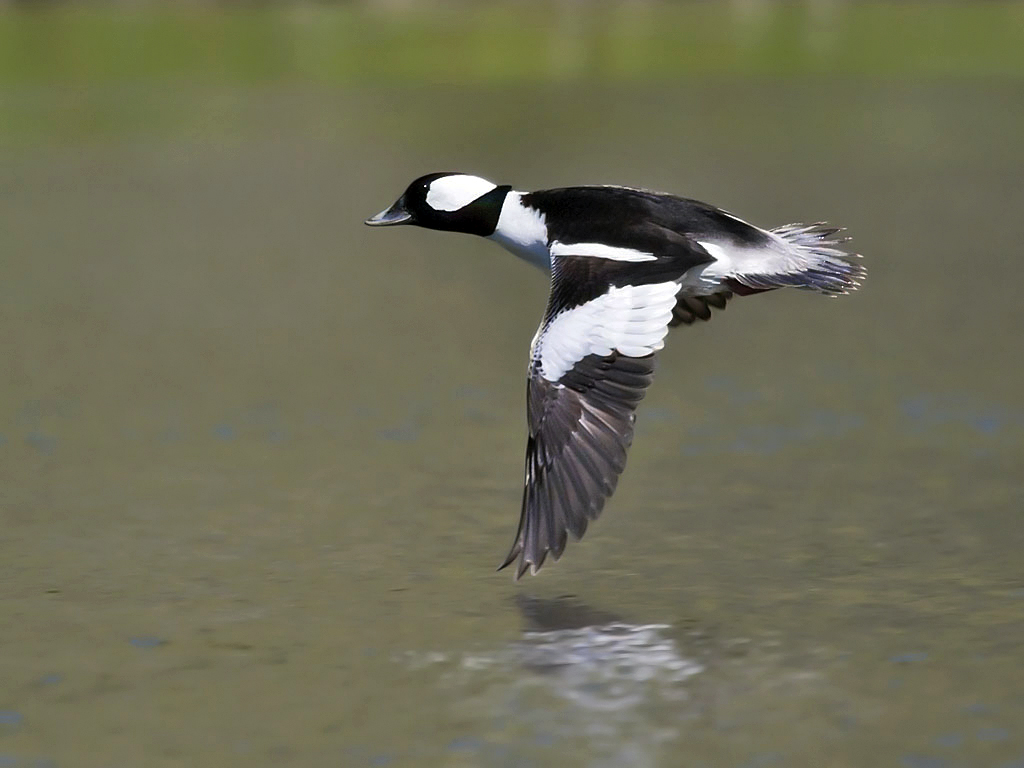
Male flying in California

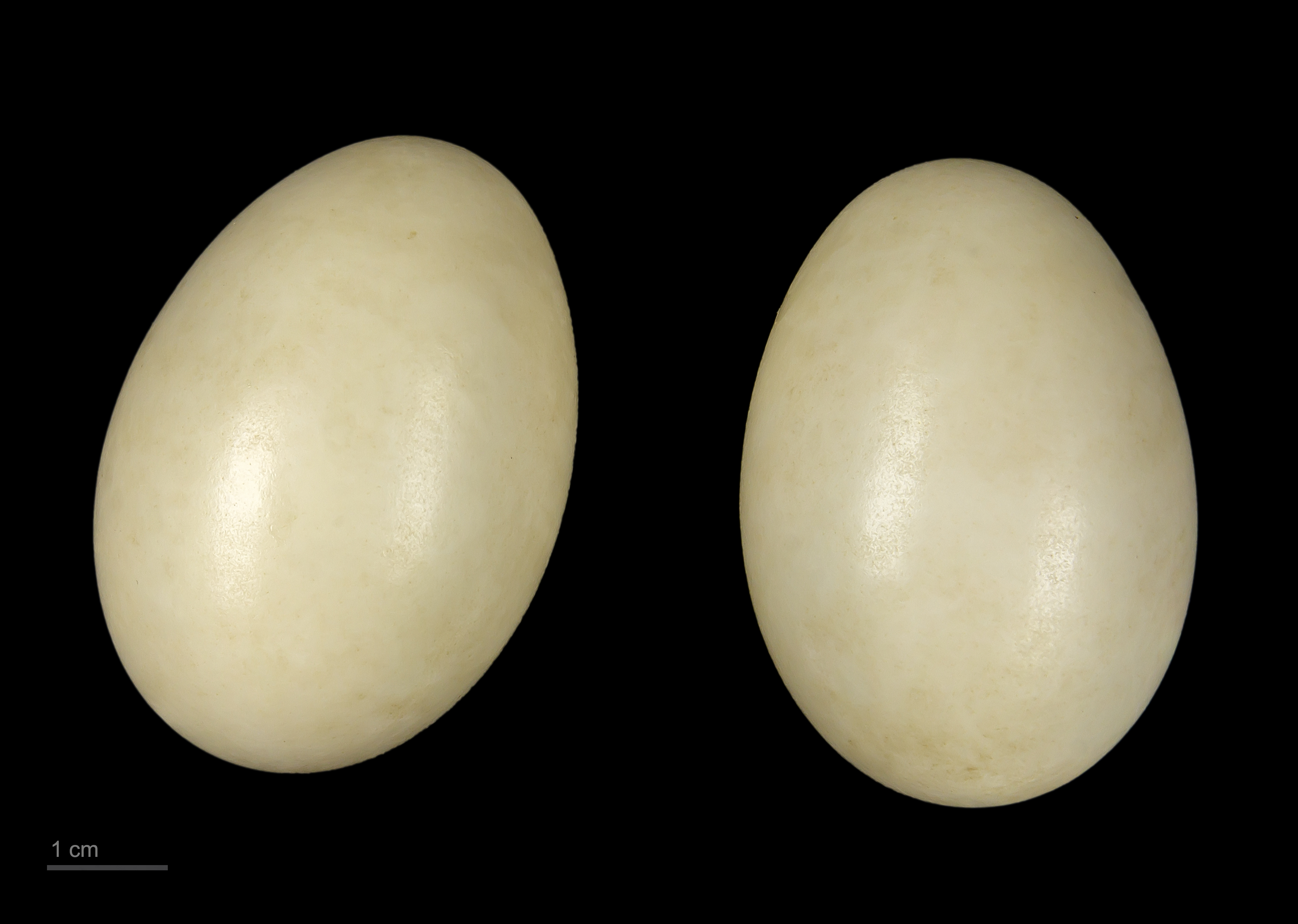
Bucephala albeola - MHNT

Buffleheads have evolved their small size to fit the nesting cavity of their "metabiotic" host, a woodpecker, the northern flicker. Due to their small size, they are highly active, undertaking dives almost continuously while sustained by their high metabolism. They do not tend to collect in large flocks; groups are usually limited to small numbers. One duck serves as a sentry, watching for predators as the others in the group dive in search of food. Buffleheads are amongst the last waterfowl to leave their breeding grounds and one of the world's most punctual migrants, arriving on their wintering grounds within a narrow margin of time.

=== Breeding ===
Buffleheads are monogamous ducks. They nest in cavities in trees, primarily aspens or poplars, using mostly old flicker nests, close (usually < 25 m (82 ft)) to water. Nest competitors include mountain bluebird (Sialia currucoides), tree swallow (Tachycineta bicolor), and European starling. There was one recorded instance of a female Barrow's goldeneye killing a bufflehead adult female and her brood. Smaller cavities are preferred because of less competition with the larger goldeneyes. Females may be killed on the nest by mammals, such as foxes (Vulpes and Urocyon sp.), weasels (Mustela and Neogale sp.) or mink (Neogale vison), and by goldeneyes over nest competition. In the summer, the ducks have breeding grounds near lakes in the boreal forest and aspen parklands of central Canada.

Average clutch size is nine (range six to 11), and eggs average 50.5 by 36.3 mm (1.99 by 1.43 in). Incubation averages 30 days, and nest success is high (79% in one study) compared to ground-nesting species like the teal. A day after the last duckling hatches, the brood leaps from the nest cavity. The young fledge at 50–55 days of age. Predators of adults include the peregrine falcon (Falco peregrinus), snowy owl (Bubo scandiacus), bald eagle (Haliaeetus leucocephalus), golden eagle (Aquila chrysaetos), red-tailed hawk (Buteo jamaicensis), great horned owl (Bubo virginianus), and Cooper's hawk (Astur cooperii).

=== Diet ===
These diving birds forage underwater. They prefer water depths of 1.2–4.5 m (3.9–14.8 ft). In freshwater habitats, they eat primarily insects, and in saltwater, they feed predominantly on crustaceans and mollusks. Aquatic plants and fish eggs can often become locally important food items, as well.

== Relationship with humans ==
Because of their striking plumage, highly active nature, and proximity to humans on waterfront properties, buffleheads are one of the most popular birds amongst bird watchers. The bufflehead, also known as the spirit duck, was added to the coat of arms of the town of Sidney, British Columbia, in 1995. Buffleheads are hunted and are considered a gamebird. In contrast to many other seaducks that have declined in recent decades, bufflehead numbers have remained relatively constant.
