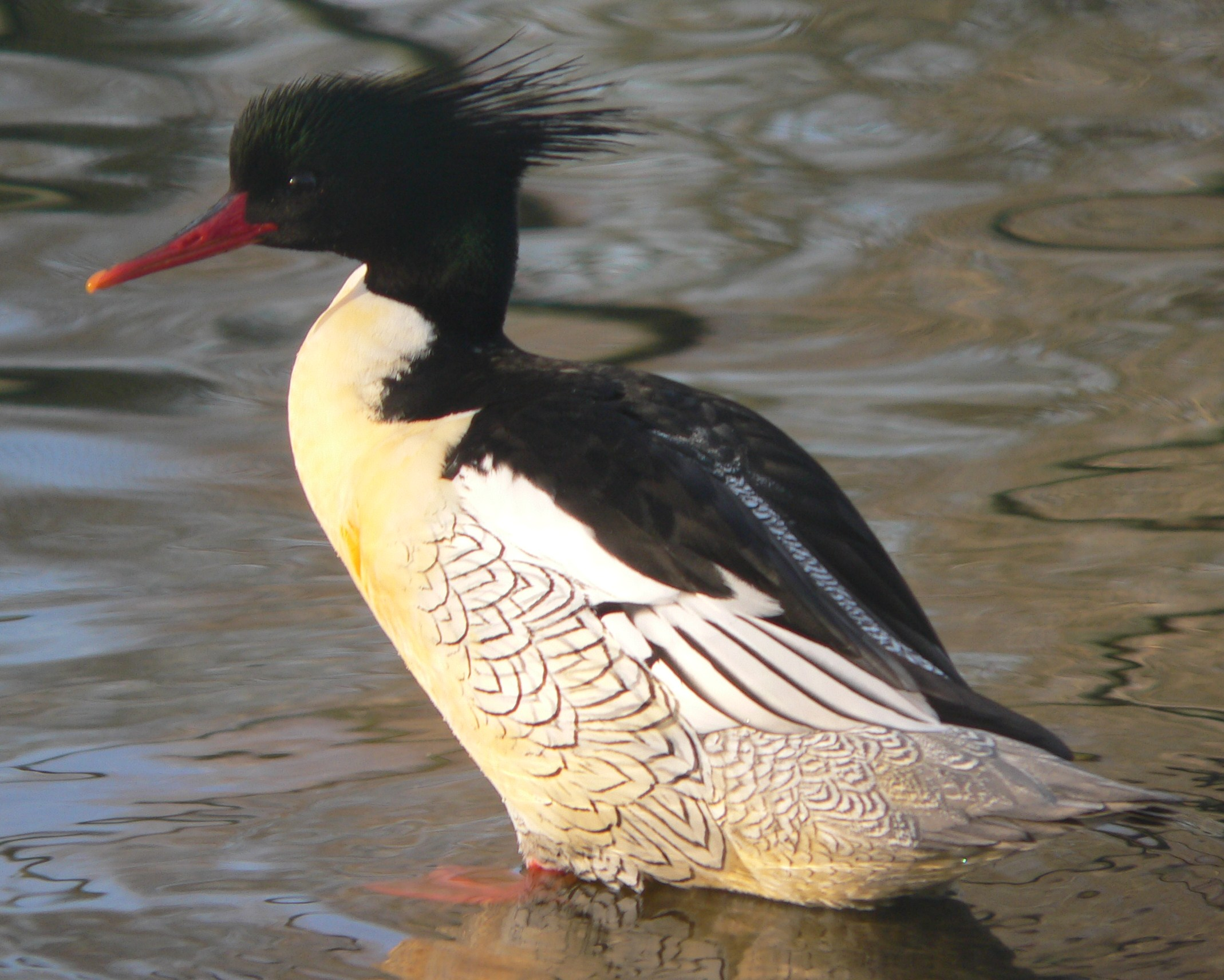
- Adult male
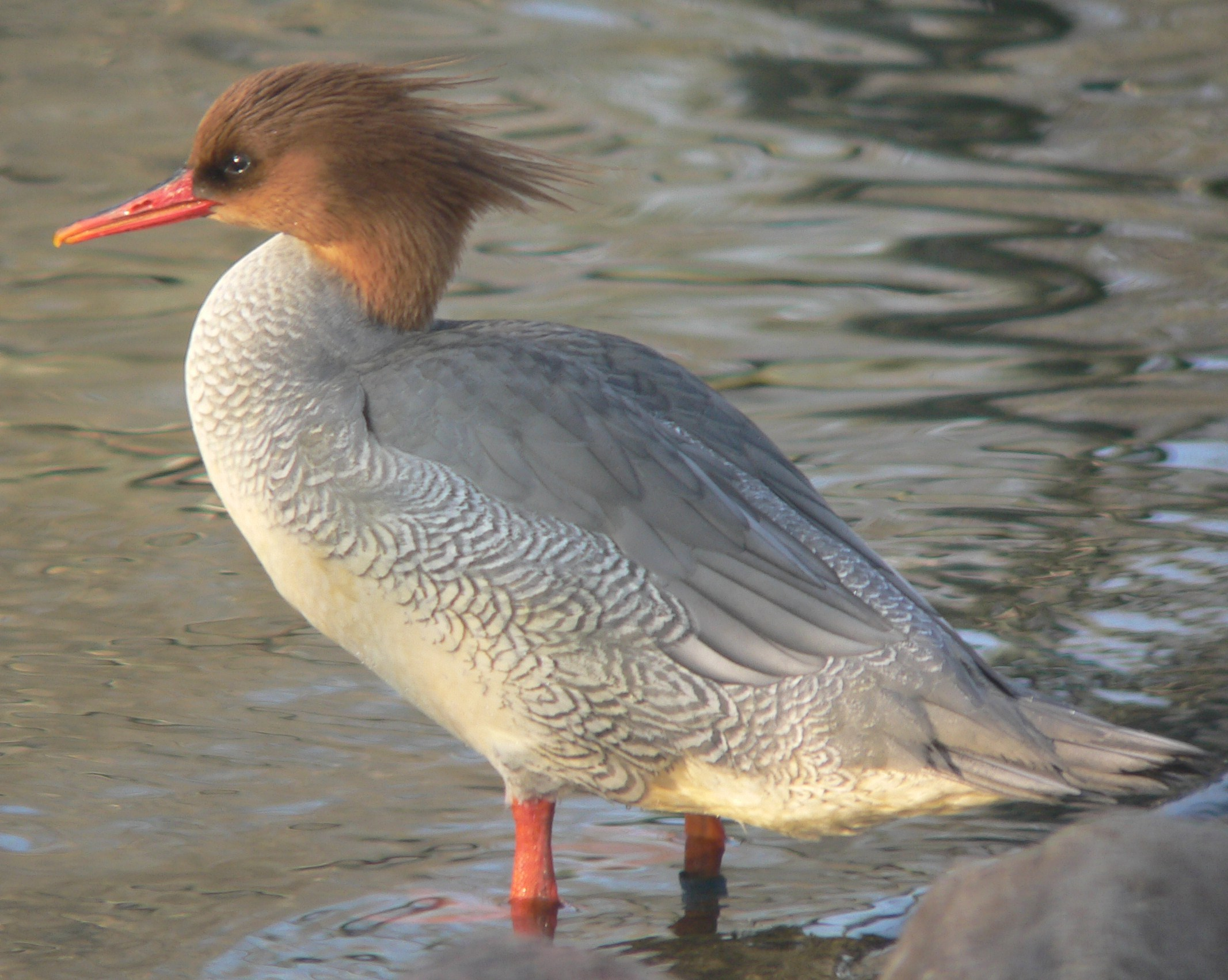
- Adult female

Conservation status
- Endangered (IUCN 3.1)

Scientific classification
- Kingdom: Animalia
- Phylum: Chordata
- Class: Aves
- Order: Anseriformes
- Family: Anatidae
- Genus: Mergus
- Species: M. squamatus

Binomial name
- Mergus squamatus Gould, 1864

= Scaly-sided merganser =

Species of bird

The scaly-sided merganser or Chinese merganser (Mergus squamatus) is an endangered typical merganser (genus Mergus). It lives in Manchuria and extreme Southeast Siberia, breeding in the north and wintering in the south.

== Description ==
This striking sea duck has a thin red bill and a scaled dark pattern on the flanks and rump. Both sexes have a crest of wispy elongated feathers, reaching almost to the shoulders in adult males and being fairly short in females and immatures. The adult male has a black head and neck, white breast and underparts, and blackish mantle and wings, except for the white innerwings. The scaling is also black, while the tail is medium grey. The female has a buffish head and otherwise replaces the male's black with grey colour. The legs are orange-red and the irides dark brown in both sexes.

== Ecology ==
Their breeding habitat is rivers in primary forest in the southeastern Russian Far East, perhaps in North Korea, and in two locations Changbai Mountains and small isolated location in Lesser Xingan Mtns. in northeastern China. The bulk of the species' population breed in Russian Far East (85%) and Changbaishan both in China and DPRK M. squamatus are migratory, wintering in central and southern China, with small numbers in Japan, South Korea, Taiwan, northern Vietnam, Myanmar and Thailand. They arrive on the breeding grounds as soon as winter is over, in March, and leave when the first cold nights come in mid November.

This shy and easily startled bird favors mid-sized rivers which meander through wide expanses of mixed forest in the mountains, up to 1,000 meters (3,300 ft) ASL or less. Birds tend to move upriver during the day, both when startled and when foraging; the latter is probably because stirred-up sediments will alert and hide prey downstream. Food is caught with the serrated beak from among the riverbed gravel. Often the birds dive for prey, repeatedly submerging for a quarter-to half-minute with only a few seconds pause between dives. In shallow water, the birds submerge only the head; they do not upend. The birds are not very social during breeding period and they gather in small groups in autumn and winter. Even on the wintering grounds, groups of more than a dozen are very rare.

They spend most of the daylight time foraging, except around noon when they take some time to rest, preen and socialize at the river banks, where they also sleep. The food of M. squamatus consists of aquatic arthropods, frogs and small to medium-sized fish. Stonefly (Plecoptera) and Phryganeidae giant caddisfly larvae may constitute the bulk of its diet when available. Beetles and crustaceans are eaten less regularly, though the latter may be more important in autumn. As aquatic insect larvae hatch in the course of the summer, fish become more prominent in the diet. Favorite fish species include the dojo loach (Misgurnus anguillicaudatus) and the lenok Brachymystax lenok. More rarely eaten are such species as the lamprey Eudontomyzon morii, the sculpin Mesocottus haitej, or the Arctic grayling (Thymallus arcticus). Thus, they are opportunistic feeders; regarding fish, they will probably eat any species that has the correct elongated shape and small size.

Scaly-sided mergansers nest in trees, as typical for the merganser and goldeneye lineage of sea ducks. Preferred nesting trees are such species as daimyo oak (Quercus dentata, Chinese: 柞栎), Chozenia, Linden and Ussuri poplar (Populus ussuriensis, 大青杨; a balsam poplar). Easy breed in artificial nest boxes on the rivers with destroyed forests on banks.

They are sympatric with Mandarin ducks (Aix galericulata); perhaps competing for nesting holes (which neither can excavate themselves). In its winter quarters, the scaly-sided merganser might compete with other Merginae with which it shares its habitat then, e.g. common mergansers (M. merganser) and common goldeneyes (Bucephala clangula).

== Status ==
This species is considered endangered by the IUCN. Its numbers declined in the 1960s and 1970s due to loss of primary forests in its limited range, particularly along the major rivers in Russia. Current threats include illegal hunting, entanglement in (ghost) fishing nets and river pollution, as well as ongoing destruction of forest. According to its current IUCN classification EN C2a(ii), fewer than 5000 adult and first and second year old birds remain, and most of these are found in Primorye and South Khabarovsk regions of Russia (85%)

World population survey was completed in 2014 both in Russia and China, the number for North Korea was estimated without survey there. Surveys on dispersal wintering grounds are useless and the way to estimate world population is to survey pristine rivers within breeding range. Rivers of Central China, primarily tributaries of Yangtze River, and all rivers of South Korea constitutes the wintering area well known nowadays. Habitat loss in China led to breeding range reduction and fragmentation there. In Russia population seems to stabilize in 1900th and until now.

== Threats and conservation measures ==
Winter ecology and conservation threats to the scaly-sided merganser were reported in 2012. Threats include sand mining, fishing, riparian vegetation destruction, habitat fragmentation, and water pollution. Recommended conservation measures include provision of artificial nest boxes, informing local residents of the merganser's status, fishing regulation, protection of critical habitat, controlling recreation on breeding rivers and the raising of domestic ducks in areas where the mergansers winter, management of hydrology in ways that protect and benefit the merganser, and annual population surveys at key breeding rivers.

== See also ==
- Crested shelduck, possibly extinct waterfowl from the same region
