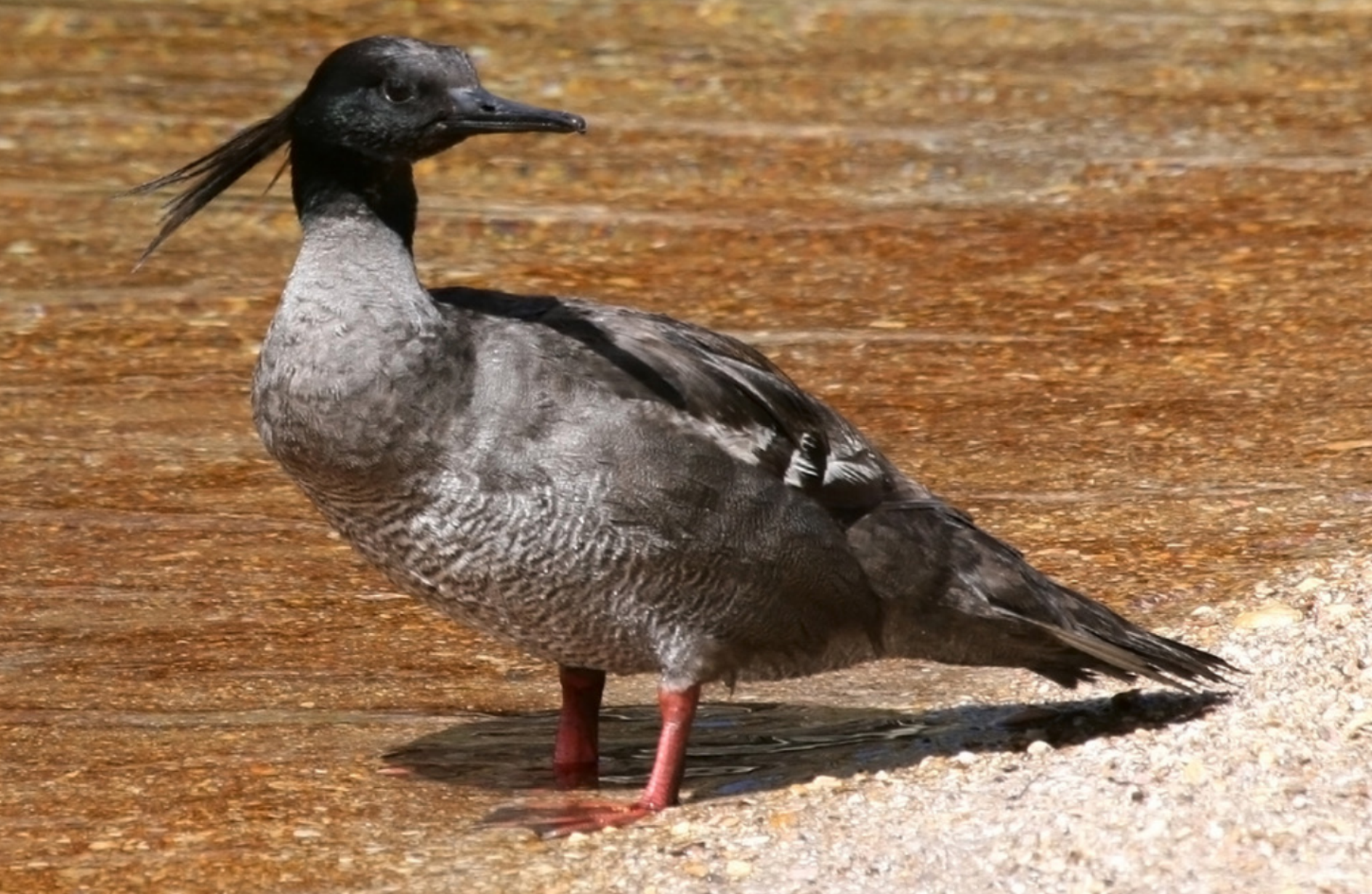

Conservation status
- Critically Endangered (IUCN 3.1)

Scientific classification
- Kingdom: Animalia
- Phylum: Chordata
- Class: Aves
- Order: Anseriformes
- Family: Anatidae
- Genus: Mergus
- Species: M. octosetaceus

Binomial name
- Mergus octosetaceus Vieillot, 1817

= Brazilian merganser =

Species of bird

The Brazilian merganser (Mergus octosetaceus) is a South American diving duck in the Mergus genus. It is one of the most threatened waterfowl species in the world, with possibly fewer than 250 birds in the wild and a small number kept in captivity in Brazil and Czechia. It has a long, sharp-edged beak with a great number of tooth-like edges.

== Description ==
This merganser is a dark, slender duck with a shiny dark-green hood with a long crest, which is usually shorter and more worn-looking in females. Upperparts are dark grey while the breast is light grey, getting paler toward the whitish belly, and a white speculum is particularly noticeable in flight. It has a long thin jagged black bill with red feet and legs. Although females are smaller with a shorter bill and crest, both sexes are alike in color. The slender ducks range in size from 49 to 56 centimetres (19 to 22 in) as an adult. Young Brazilian mergansers are mainly black with white throat and breast.

The Brazilian mergansers are generally silent birds, but may make barking calls in certain situations. Four calls have been recorded. A harsh krack-krack acts as an alarm call emitted in flight. Males make a barking dog-like call, females make a harsh rrr-rrrr and the contact call is a soft rak-rak-rak. Ducklings give a high pitched ik-ik-ik.

Depending on the availability of suitable nesting and feeding sites, Brazilian merganser pairs occupy permanent territories of 8-to-14-kilometre (5.0 to 8.7 mi) stretches of rivers. Tree cavities, rock crevices, or disused burrows predominantly made by armadillos are the ideal places for these mergansers to build their nests. It is thought the breeding season is during the austral winter, when rain is minimal and water levels are low, but it may vary geographically. The Brazilian merganser usually lays three to six eggs in June and July, with the chicks hatching during the following July and August. The young are capable of flight by September and/or October. Only the female birds incubate the eggs, but both parents care for the young. This is a very unusual behavior in ducks for both parents to help raise the young birds including direct provision of food to young. Adult Brazilian mergansers are believed to remain on the same territory all year round, but there is not very much information about their movements and dispersal, so information on this is presently speculative in nature.

Fish is the Brazilian merganser's main food, and they also eat molluscs, insects and their larvae. The birds, usually in pairs, capture fish by diving in river rapids and backwater.

== Population ==
The merganser population is believed to have less than 250 birds. Originally, the duck's geographical distribution comprised central-south Brazil and adjacent regions in Paraguay and Argentina. Currently, all confirmed populations are located in Brazil and a more recent population in Argentina and information on most populations is very scarce. The Brazilian merganser population in the Serra da Canastra region is the most significant and best known, with populations occurring hundreds of kilometers away from each other. There are 47 individuals—28 adults and 19 young—in the Serra de Canastra region as of 2006. Most mergansers are found in the Serra da Canastra National Park. 70 birds have been seen near the park's headquarters in rio São Francisco. In Jalapão region are estimated 13 individuals in Novo river on 2009/2010 (four couples and some solitary adults).

In 2002, the species was also found on the Arroyo Uruzu in Misiones, Argentina, the first record in the country for ten years, despite extensive surveys done by local researchers conducted throughout previous years. The bird was last reported seen in 1984 in Paraguay, where very little habitat remains; however some local reports show that a few individuals may still be living in the area.

== Habitat ==
The slender Brazilian mergansers live in low densities in remote and mountainous regions where it inhabits clean rivers and streams with river rapids and riparian vegetation. Brazilian mergansers are very territorial birds defending large stretches of river and the land surrounding the fast-flowing water. They are recognized as a resident species that does not abandon the watercourses where it established its territory. They do not move or want to move once their habitats have disappeared. The birds need large territories and their habitat is fast dwindling.

== Threat ==
The Brazilian mergansers are very sensitive to habitat degradation and loss primarily due to human actions. A major threat to the birds' survival is the issue of silting of rivers caused by the expansion of farming activities, mining, watershed degradation and soil erosion, as well as deforestation.

Current traditional soil management and use practices in the region from farming may bring about serious damage regarding conservation of natural resources, especially water, on which the Brazilian mergansers and the farmers themselves are dependent. One of the farming practices here is shifting cultivation. It is common in the region to see farmers burning forest areas causing environmental damage to the natural vegetation and soils and the resident species.

A new threat to the species includes the installation of hydroelectric plants. Hydropower plants are planned to be built in the same rivers that Brazilian mergansers have been found in Paraná (rio Tibagi), Goiás (rio Paranã) and Tocantins (rio Novo). The hydropower plants are a major threat to the birds' survival because the plants transform systems such as creeks, rivers and streams into turbid lake systems. The project has government backing in spite of the damage it may cause.

Dam-building has also become a major part in the disappearance of these birds. The filling of the Urugua-i reservoir, which took place between 1989 and 1991, had a major impact on Brazilian mergansers in Argentina. The population declined drastically when its fast-flowing rivers were turned into large lakes. After the Urugua-i dam was built, the birds have only been seen on the Uruzu stream, a tributary of the Urugua-i. The dams flood suitable habitat, especially in Brazil and Paraguay, where the Brazilian mergansers build their nests and lay their eggs.

Another threat to the Brazilian merganser is tourism. The scenic beauty of Serra de Canastra National Park brings people from around the world to see the ecotourism landmark. Tourists are attracted to the abundant supply of clear water with over 150 waterfalls in the area. Sporting activities also create a disturbance for the Brazilian mergansers. Activities such as canoeing and rafting disturb the natural habitats for the Brazilian mergansers that thrive on the rapid-rivers, interrupting breeding patterns. Water pollution and deforestation are also a concern as new facilities are built.

Other threats include inbreeding, pesticides and predation. Very few individuals survive from these threats and extinction may be imminent. People hunting the birds for food and collecting them for exhibition specimens contributed to the decline of the species.

== Conservation ==
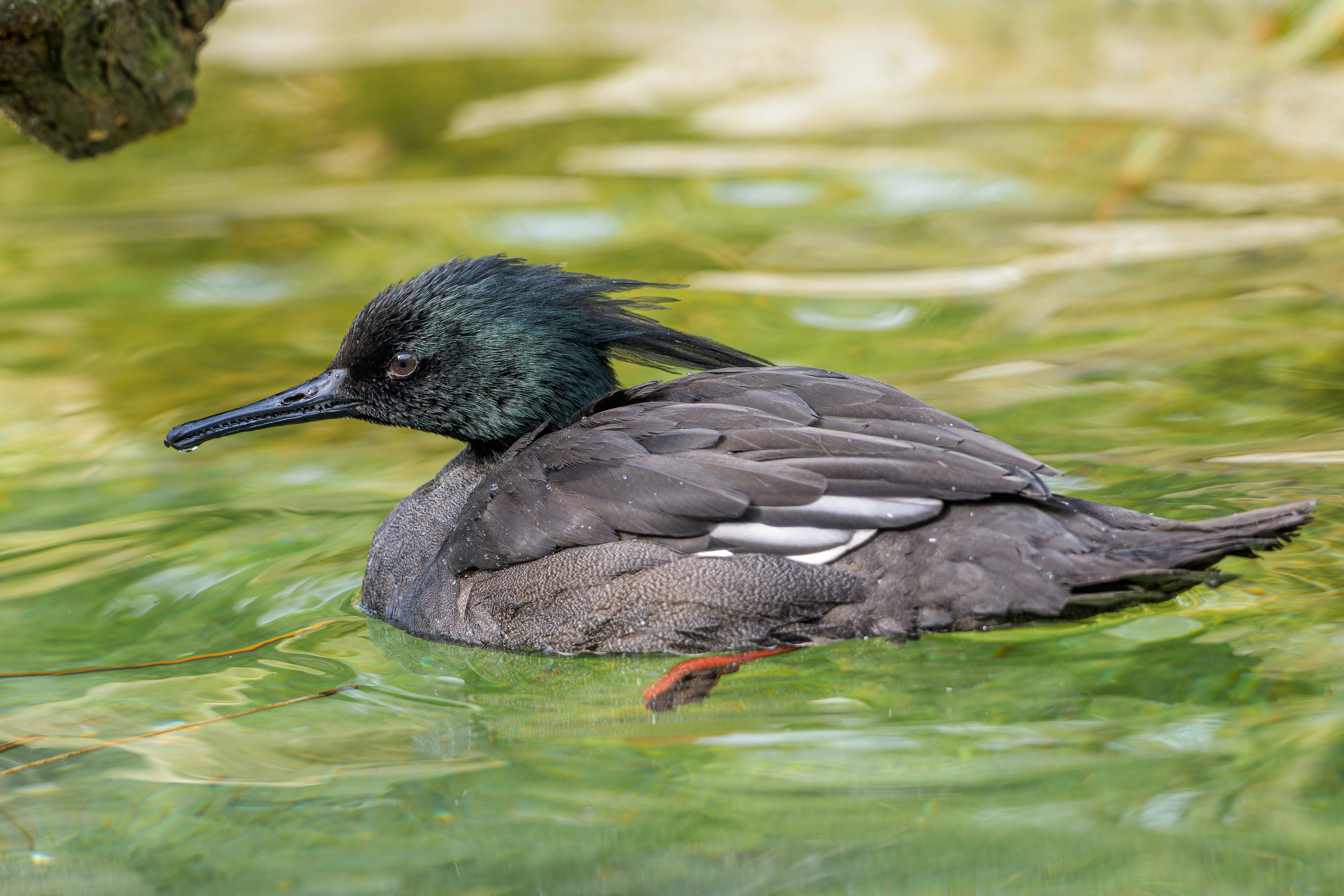
Brazilian merganser in Prague Zoo

The Brazilian merganser captive-breeding program is led by Itatiba Zooparque, a zoo in Itatiba, São Paulo state, Brazil. The first collected eggs of Brazilian mergansers hatched in captivity in this zoo in 2011 and in 2017, Itatiba Zooparque announced the successful breeding of the first generation in captivity. In 2020, they announced 15 new ducklings and for the first time, they had second-generation ducklings. For the first time, one female laid seven fertilized eggs and they all hatched. As of 2025, the only institution outside Brazil keeping Brazilian mergansers was the Prague Zoo, which received its first breeding group from Itatiba Zooparque in autumn 2023 and introduced them to visitors in 2024. First five ducklings hatched in Prague in spring 2025.
