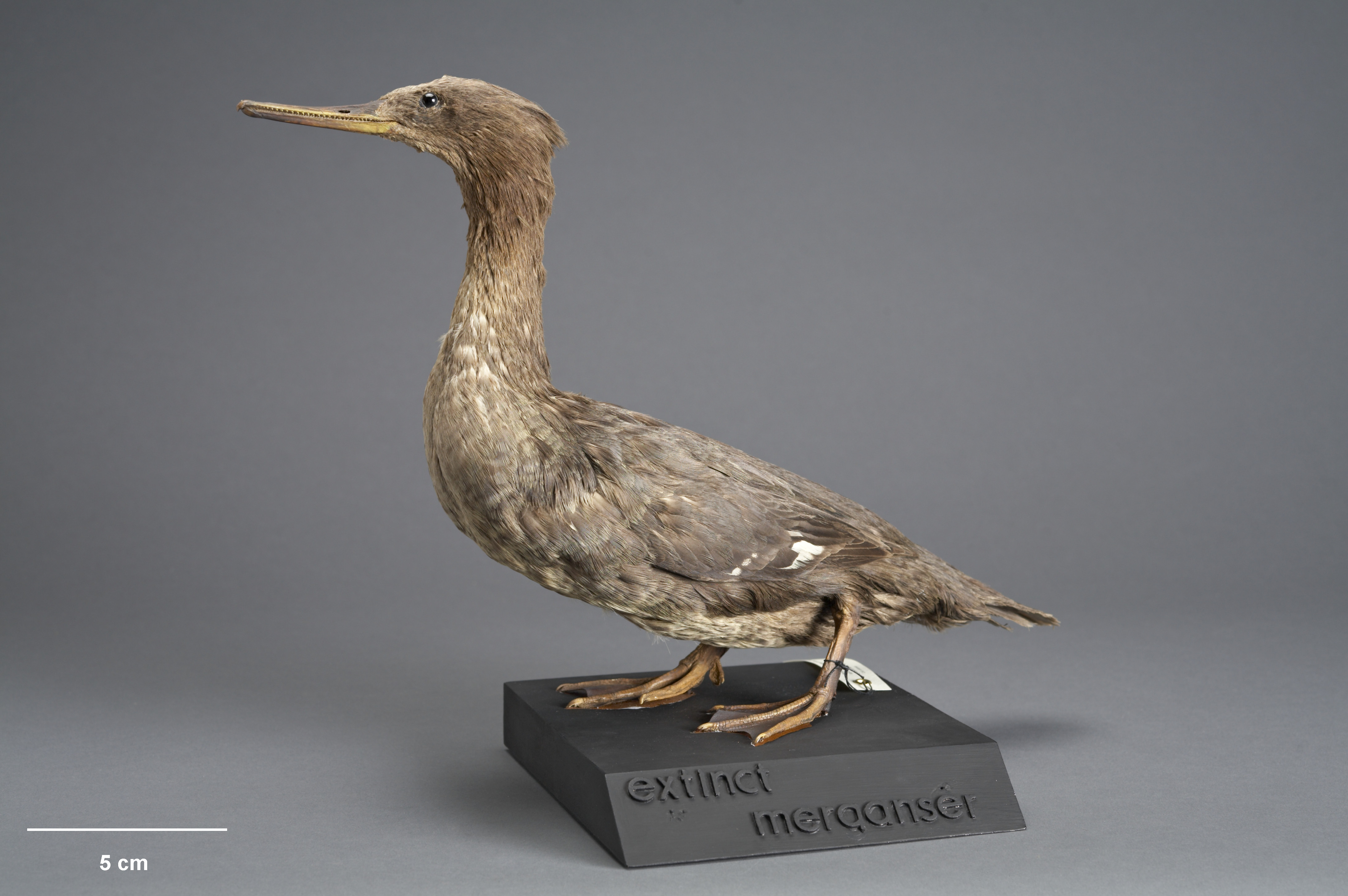
- Stuffed specimen from 1902

Conservation status
- Extinct (c.1902) (IUCN 3.1)

- Extinct (c.1902) (NZ TCS)

Scientific classification
- Kingdom: Animalia
- Phylum: Chordata
- Class: Aves
- Order: Anseriformes
- Family: Anatidae
- Genus: Mergus
- Species: †M. australis

Binomial name
- †Mergus australis Hombron & Jacquinot, 1841
- Original range of the Auckland Island merganser

= Auckland Island merganser =

Auckland Island merganser Temporal range: Late Holocene

Extinct species of bird

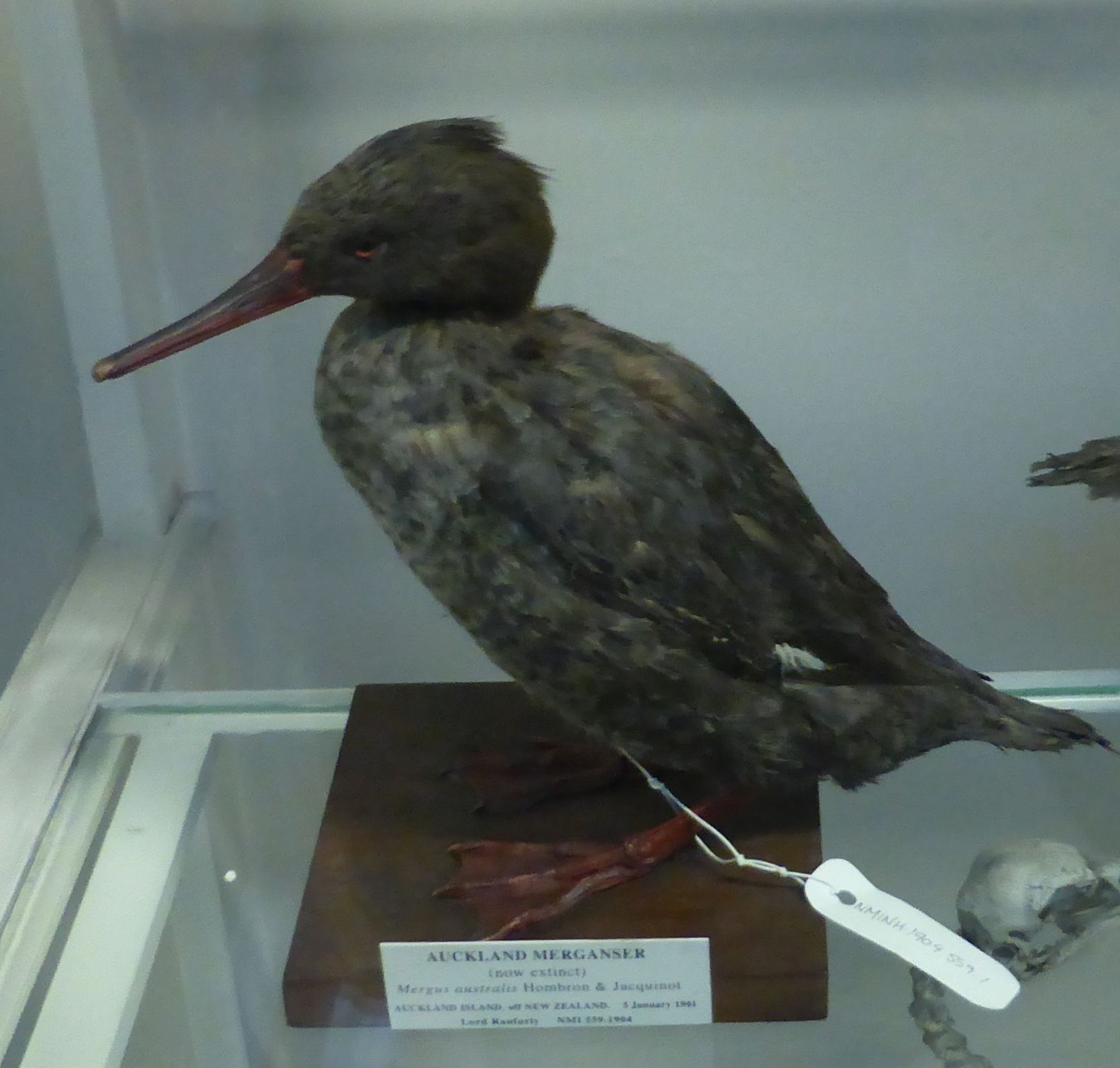
Auckland Island merganser specimen in National Museum of Ireland – Natural History, acquired from Lord Ranfurly, Governor General of New Zealand in 1904

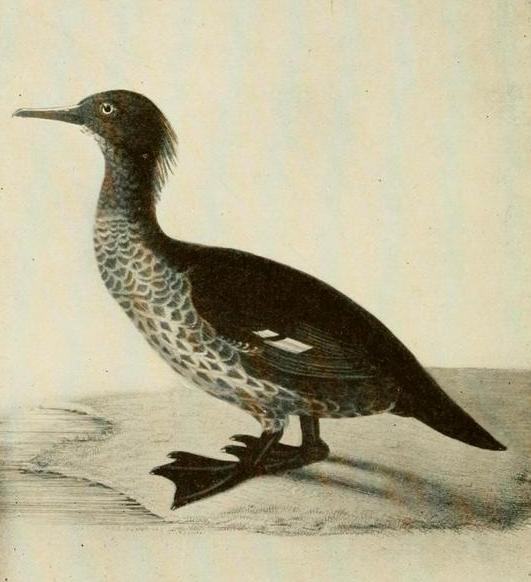
Illustration from 1909

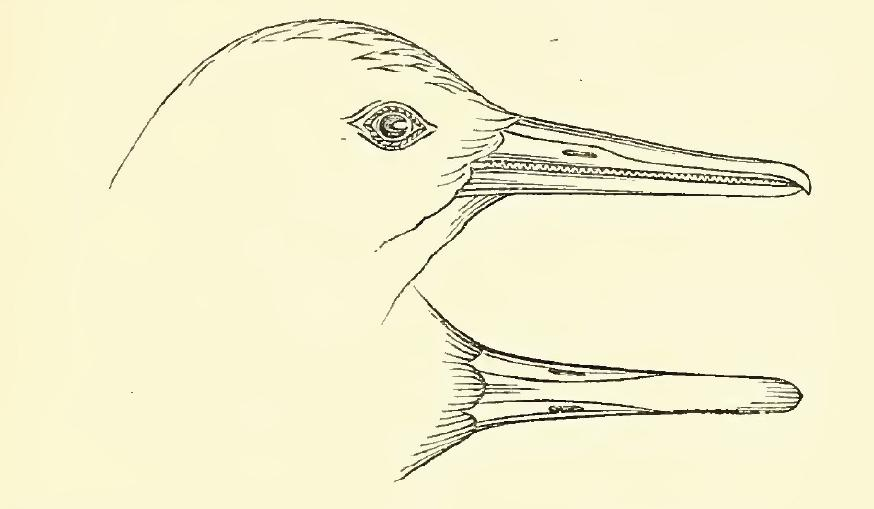
Drawing of the head

The Auckland Island merganser (Mergus australis) (Māori: Miuweka), also known as the New Zealand merganser, is an extinct species of typical merganser.

== Description ==
This duck was similar in size to the red-breasted merganser (Mergus serrator). The adult male had a dark reddish-brown head, crest and neck, with bluish black mantle and tail and slate grey wings. The female was slightly smaller with a shorter crest.

== History ==
The Auckland Island merganser was known from the Auckland Islands archipelago, part of the New Zealand Subantarctic Islands. The only historical records are from Auckland Island and Adams Island. Holocene bones were found on Enderby Island. The species was formally described in 1841.

The closely related extinct Chatham Island merganser (Mergus milleneri) is known from Holocene bones found on Chatham Island, New Zealand. The species identity of merganser bones from mainland New Zealand—North, South, and Stewart Islands—is unresolved.

== Extinction ==
The last specimens were apparently a pair shot on 9 January 1902, and the species is now extinct. It was not found in a 1909 search, and a thorough 1972/1973 exploration of possible habitat concluded that it was long extinct. Its decline was caused by a combination of hunting and predation by introduced mammals.
