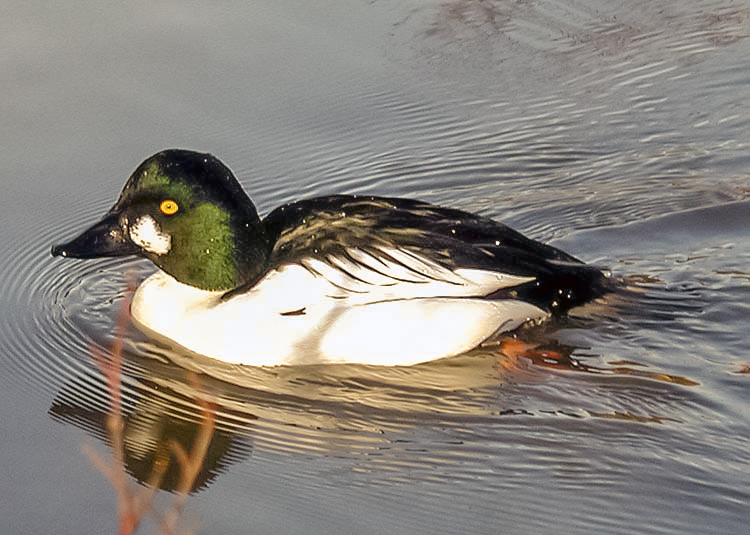
- Common goldeneye (Bucephala clangula)

Scientific classification
- Kingdom: Animalia
- Phylum: Chordata
- Class: Aves
- Order: Anseriformes
- Family: Anatidae
- Subfamily: Merginae
- Genus: Bucephala; S.F. Baird, 1858

Type species
- Anas albeola (bufflehead) Linnaeus, 1758

Species
- Bucephala albeola Bucephala clangula Bucephala islandica

Synonyms
- Glaucionetta; Charitonetta see text

= Goldeneye (duck) =

Genus of birds

Bucephala is a genus of diving ducks found in the Northern Hemisphere.

== Taxonomy ==
The genus Bucephala was introduced in 1858 by American naturalist Spencer Baird with the bufflehead as the type species. The genus name is derived from Ancient Greek βουκέφαλος bouképhalos, meaning 'bullheaded', from boûs 'bull', and kephalḗ, 'head', a reference to the crest of the bufflehead making its head look large.

The bufflehead was formerly treated as the only member of the genus (sometimes unnecessarily changed to Charitonetta) while the goldeneyes were incorrectly placed in Clangula (as Clangula americana), the genus of the long-tailed duck, which at that time was placed in Harelda. It may yet be correct to recognise two genera, as the bufflehead and the two goldeneyes are well diverged. In this case, Bucephala would be restricted to B. albeola and the name Glaucionetta (Stejneger, 1885) resurrected for the goldeneyes.

== Species ==
The three living species are:

Breeding
Migration
Year-round
Nonbreeding

Genus Bucephala – S.F. Baird, 1858 – three species
| Common name | Scientific name and subspecies | Range | Size and ecology | IUCN status and estimated population |
|---|---|---|---|---|
| Common goldeneye Male Female | Bucephala clangula (Linnaeus, 1758) Two subspecies: B. c. clangula (Linnaeus, 1758); B. c. americana (Bonaparte, 1838) | Widespread in North America and Eurasia | Size: Habitat: Diet: | LC |
| Barrow's goldeneye Male Female | Bucephala islandica (Gmelin, JF, 1789) | North America and Iceland | Size: Habitat: Diet: | LC |
| Bufflehead Male Female | Bucephala albeola (Linnaeus, 1758) | North America south to Mexico | Size: Habitat: Diet: | LC |

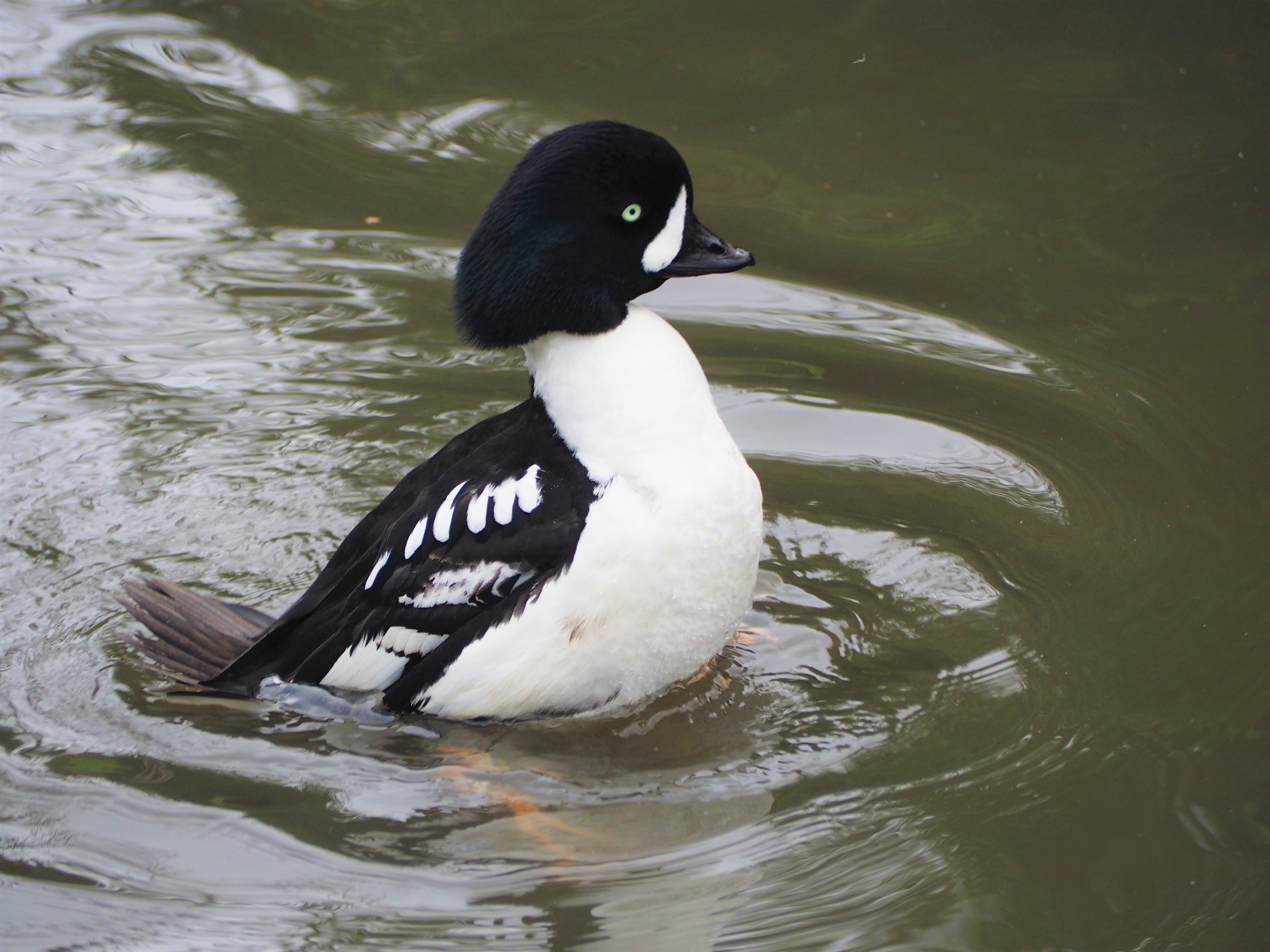
Goldeneye

Known fossil taxa are:

- Bucephala cereti (Sajóvölgyi Middle Miocene of Mátraszõlõs, Hungary - Late Pliocene of Chilhac, France)
- Bucephala ossivalis (Late Miocene/Early Pliocene of Bone Valley, United States), which was very similar to the common goldeneye and may even have been a paleosubspecies or direct ancestor
- Bucephala angustipes (Early Pleistocene of central Europe)
- Bucephala sp. (Early Pleistocene of Dursunlu, Turkey)

Bucephala fossilis (Late Pleistocene of California, United States) is now considered an extinct subspecies of the Bufflehead.
