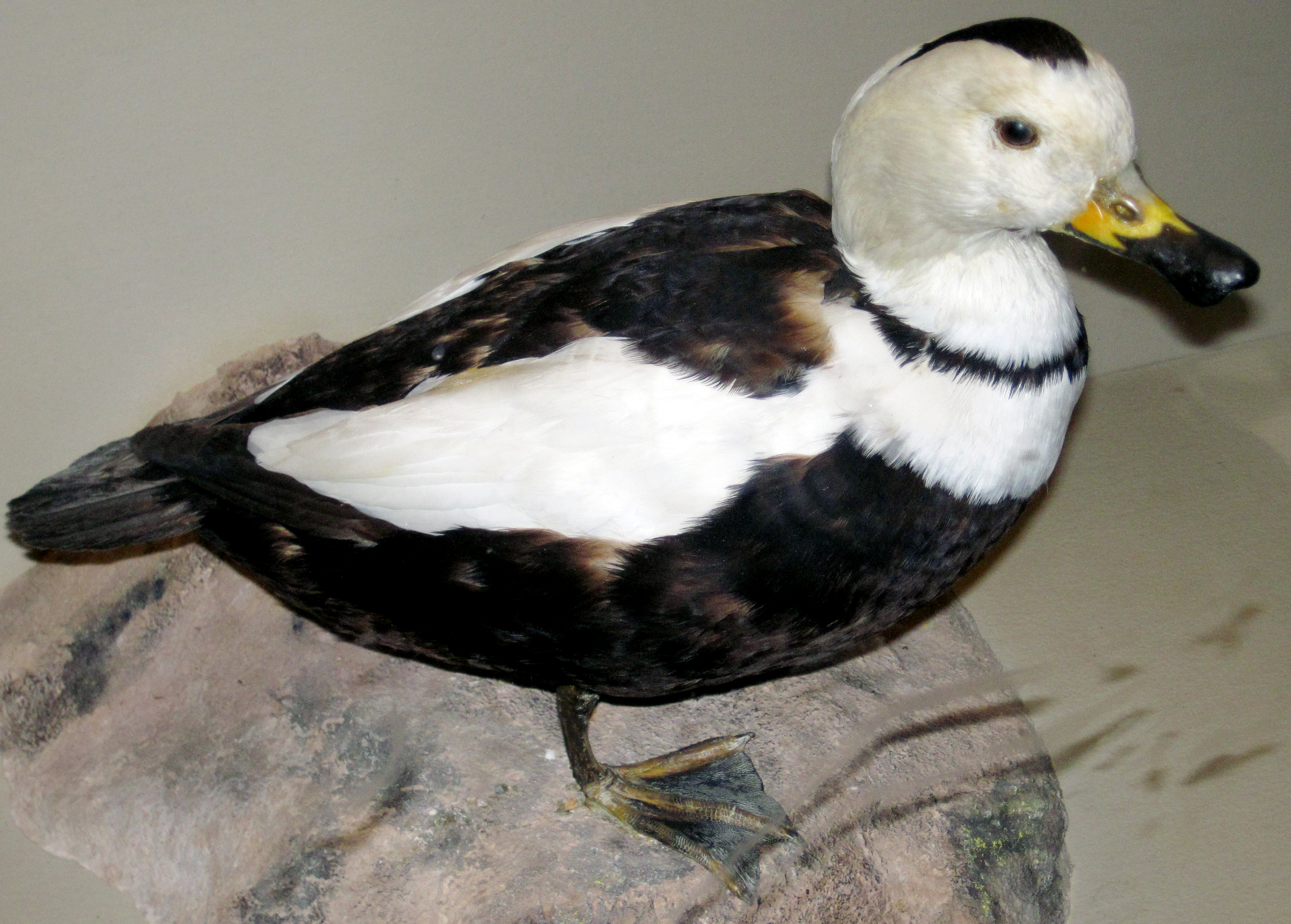
- Male, Field Museum of Natural History
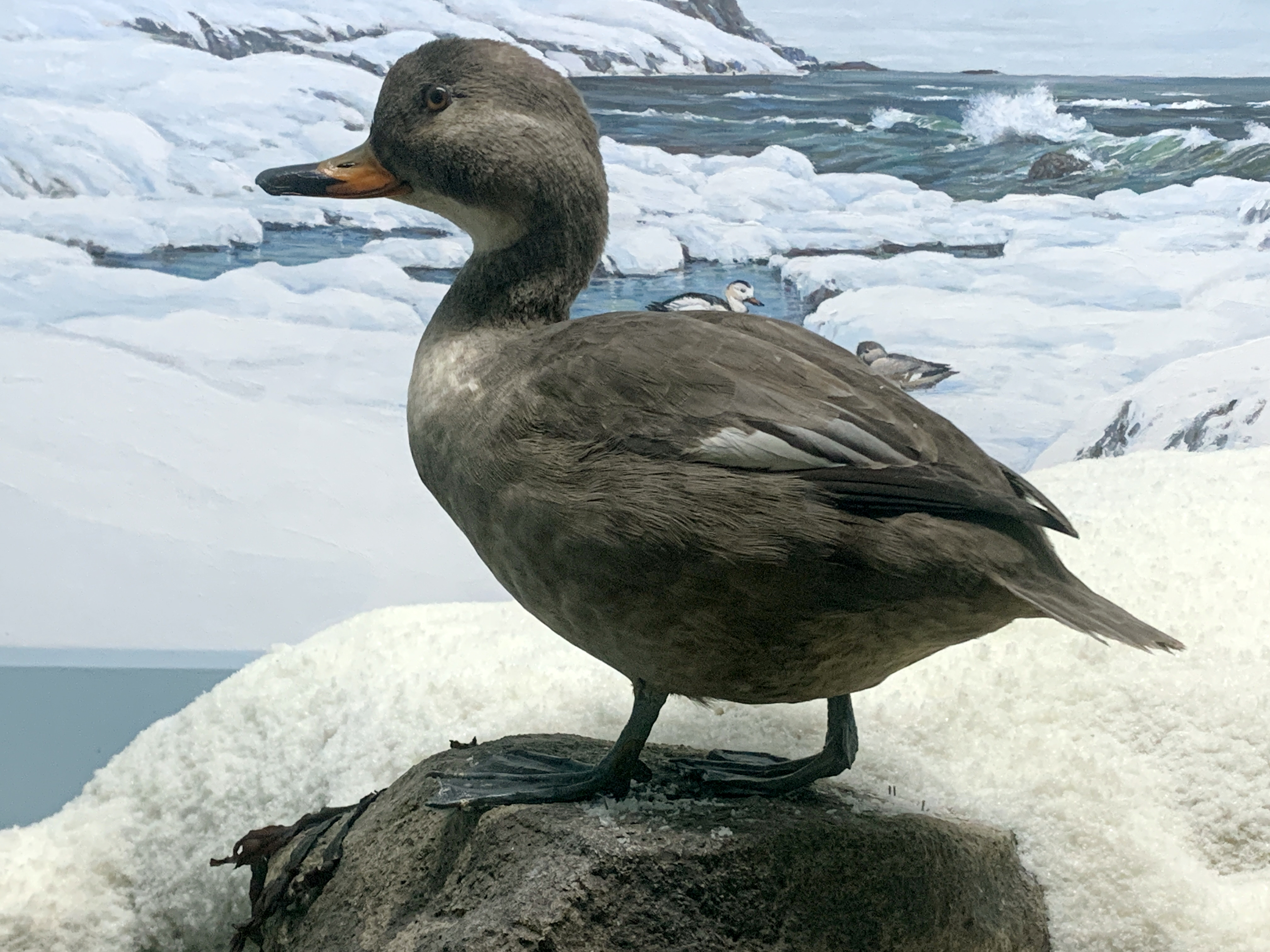
- Female specimen, American Museum of Natural History

Conservation status
- Extinct (~1878) (IUCN 3.1)

- Presumed Extinct (~1878) (NatureServe)

Scientific classification
- Kingdom: Animalia
- Phylum: Chordata
- Class: Aves
- Order: Anseriformes
- Family: Anatidae
- Subfamily: Merginae
- Genus: †Camptorhynchus; Bonaparte, 1838
- Species: †C. labradorius

Binomial name
- †Camptorhynchus labradorius (Gmelin, JF, 1789)

= Labrador duck =

Extinct species of bird

The Labrador duck (Camptorhynchus labradorius) is an extinct North American duck species. It has the distinction of being the first known endemic North American bird species to become extinct after the Columbian Exchange, with the last reported sighting occurring in 1878 in Elmira, New York, and the last preserved specimen was shot in the fall of 1875 in Long Island, New York, by J.G. Bell. It was already a rare duck before European settlers arrived, and as a result of its rarity, information on the Labrador duck is not abundant, although some, such as its habitat, characteristics, dietary habits and reasons behind its extinction, are known. There are 55 specimens of the Labrador duck preserved in museum collections around the globe.

== Taxonomy ==
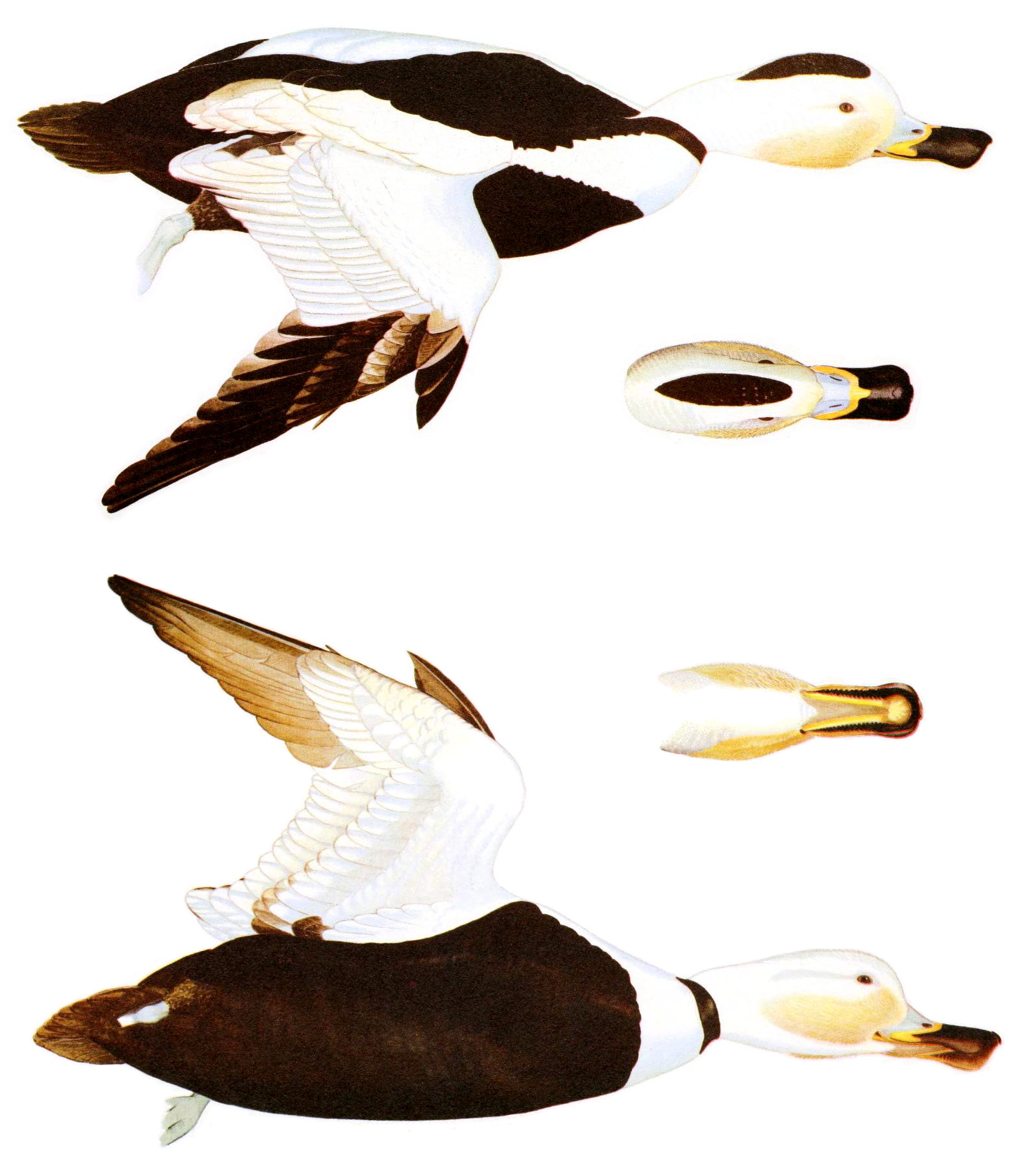
Diagram of the male

The Labrador duck was also known as the pied duck and skunk duck, the former being a vernacular name that it shared with the surf scoter and the common goldeneye (and even the American oystercatcher), a fact that has led to difficulties in interpreting old records of these species. Both names refer to the male's striking white/black pied plumage. Yet another common name was sand shoal duck, referring to its habit of feeding in shallow water.

The Labrador duck is considered a sea duck. A basic difference in the shape of the process of metacarpal I divides the sea ducks into two groups:

1. Bucephala and the mergansers
2. The eiders, scoters, Histrionicus, Clangula, and Camptorhynchus

The position of the nutrient foramen of the tarsometatarsus also separates the two groups of sea ducks. In the first group, the foramen is lateral to the long axis of the lateral groove of the hypotarsus; in the second, the foramen is on or medial to the axis of that groove.

The closest evolutionary relatives of the Labrador duck were thought to be the scoters (Melanitta), though its close ecological similarity to Steller's eider had already been noted earlier. A mitogenomic study of the placement of the Labrador duck confirmed the species to be closely related to Steller's eider, as shown below.

- Mergini
  - - - Clangula hyemalis
      - - Histrionicus histrionicus
        - - - - Polysticta stelleri
              - †Camptorhynchus labradorius
          - - Somateria fischeri
            - - Somateria mollissima
              - Somateria spectabilis
  - - - - Melanitta nigra
        - - Melanitta deglandi
          - Melanitta perspicillata
    - - - - Bucephala albeola
          - - Bucephala clangula
            - Bucephala islandica
      - - - Mergellus albellus
          - - Mergus serrator
            - Lophodytes cucullatus
            - - Mergus merganser
              - - Mergus octosetaceus
                - Mergus squamatus

== Description ==
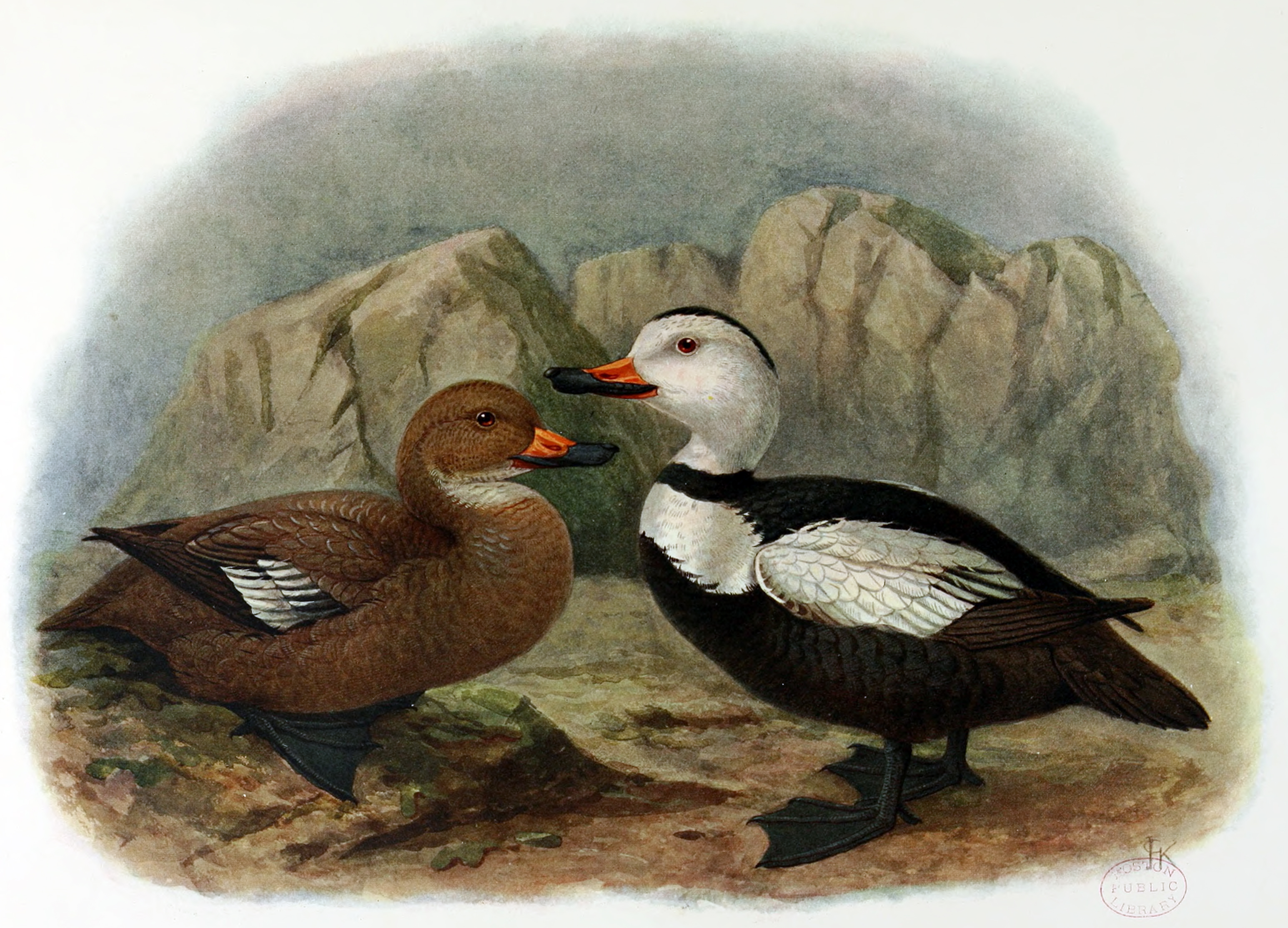
Illustration by John Gerrard Keulemans of a female and male

The female plumage was grey. Although weakly patterned, the pattern was scoter-like. The male's plumage was black and white in an eider-like pattern, but the wings were entirely white except for the primaries. The trachea of the male was scoter-like. An expansion of the tracheal tube occurred at the anterior end, and two enlargements (as opposed to one enlargement as seen in scoters) were near the middle of the tube. The bulla was bony and round, puffing out from the left side. This asymmetrical and osseus bulla was unlike that of scoters; this bulla was similar to eiders and harlequin duck's bullae. The Labrador duck has been considered the most enigmatic of all North American birds.

The Labrador duck had an oblong head with small, beady eyes. Its bill was almost as long as its head. The body was short and depressed with short, strong feet that were far behind the body. The feathers were small and the tail was short and rounded. The Labrador duck belongs to a monotypic genus.

== Habitat ==
The Labrador duck migrated annually, wintering off the coasts of New Jersey and New England in the eastern United States, where it favored southern sandy coasts, sheltered bays, harbors, and inlets, and breeding in Labrador and northern Quebec in the summer. John James Audubon's son reported seeing a nest belonging to the species in Labrador. Some believe that it may have laid its eggs on the islands in the Gulf of Saint Lawrence. The breeding biology of the Labrador duck is largely unknown.

== Diet ==
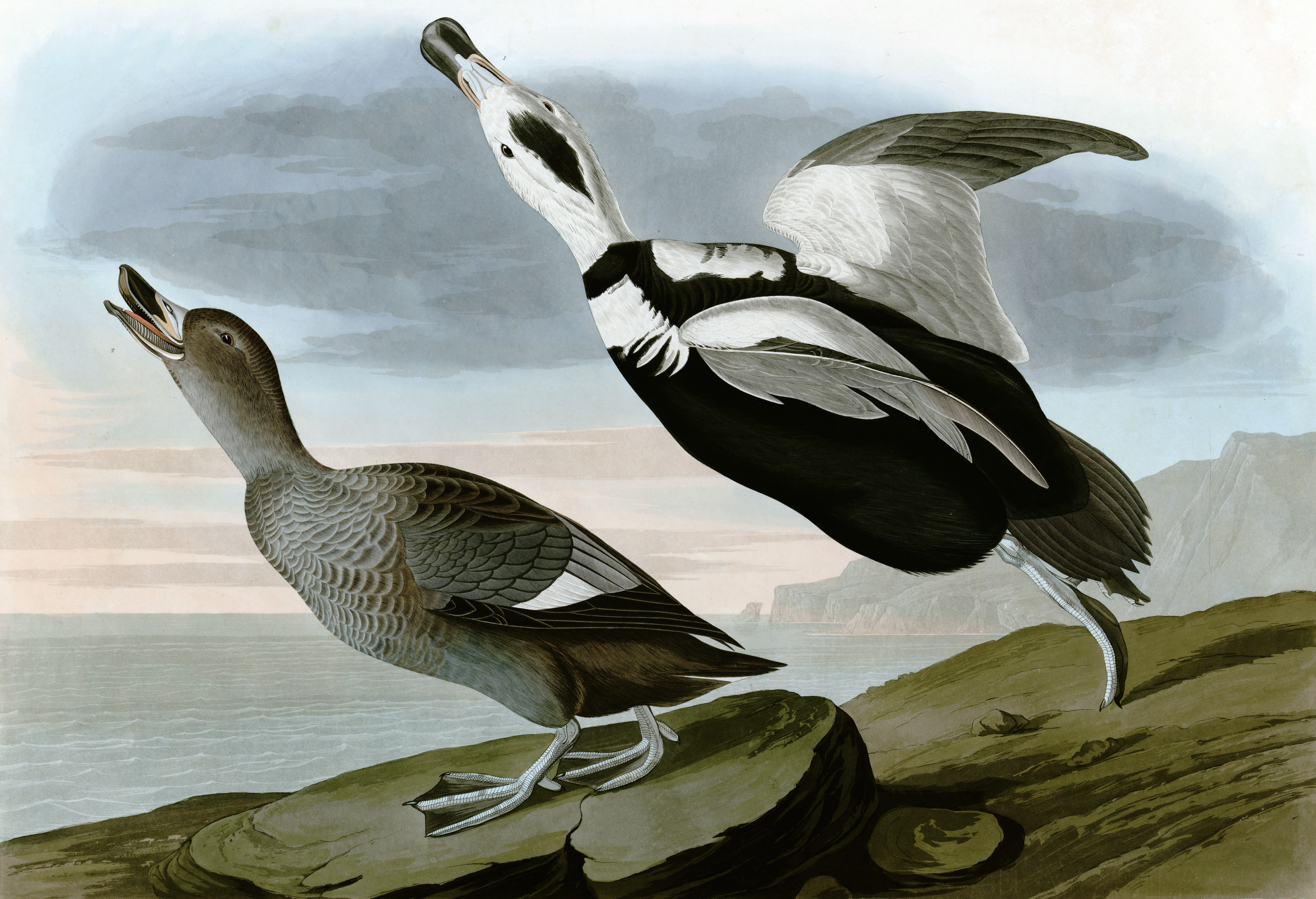
Illustration by John James Audubon

The Labrador duck fed on small molluscs, and some fishermen reported catching it on fishing lines baited with mussels. The structure of the bill was highly modified from that of most ducks, having a wide, flattened tip with numerous lamellae inside. In this way, it is considered an ecological counterpart of the North Pacific/North Asian Steller's eider. The beak was also particularly soft and may have been used to probe through sediment for food. Its peculiar bill suggests it ate shellfish and crustaceans from silt and shallow water. The Labrador duck may have survived by eating snails.

== Extinction ==
Turnaround video of a male specimen, Naturalis Biodiversity Center

The Labrador duck is thought to have been always rare, but between 1850 and 1870, populations waned further. The exact reasons for its extinction is still not fully known. The IUCN recognized the last year the species was seen as 1875. The last sighting in Canada was in 1874 on Grand Manan.

Although hunted for food, this duck was considered to taste bad, rotted quickly, and fetched a low price. Consequently, it was not sought much by hunters. However, the eggs may have been overharvested, and it may have been subject to depredations by the feather trade in its breeding area, as well. Another possible factor in the bird's extinction was the decline in mussels and other shellfish on which they are believed to have fed in their winter quarters, due to growth of population and industry on the Eastern Seaboard. Although all sea ducks readily feed on shallow-water molluscs, no Western Atlantic bird species seems to have been as dependent on such food as the Labrador duck.

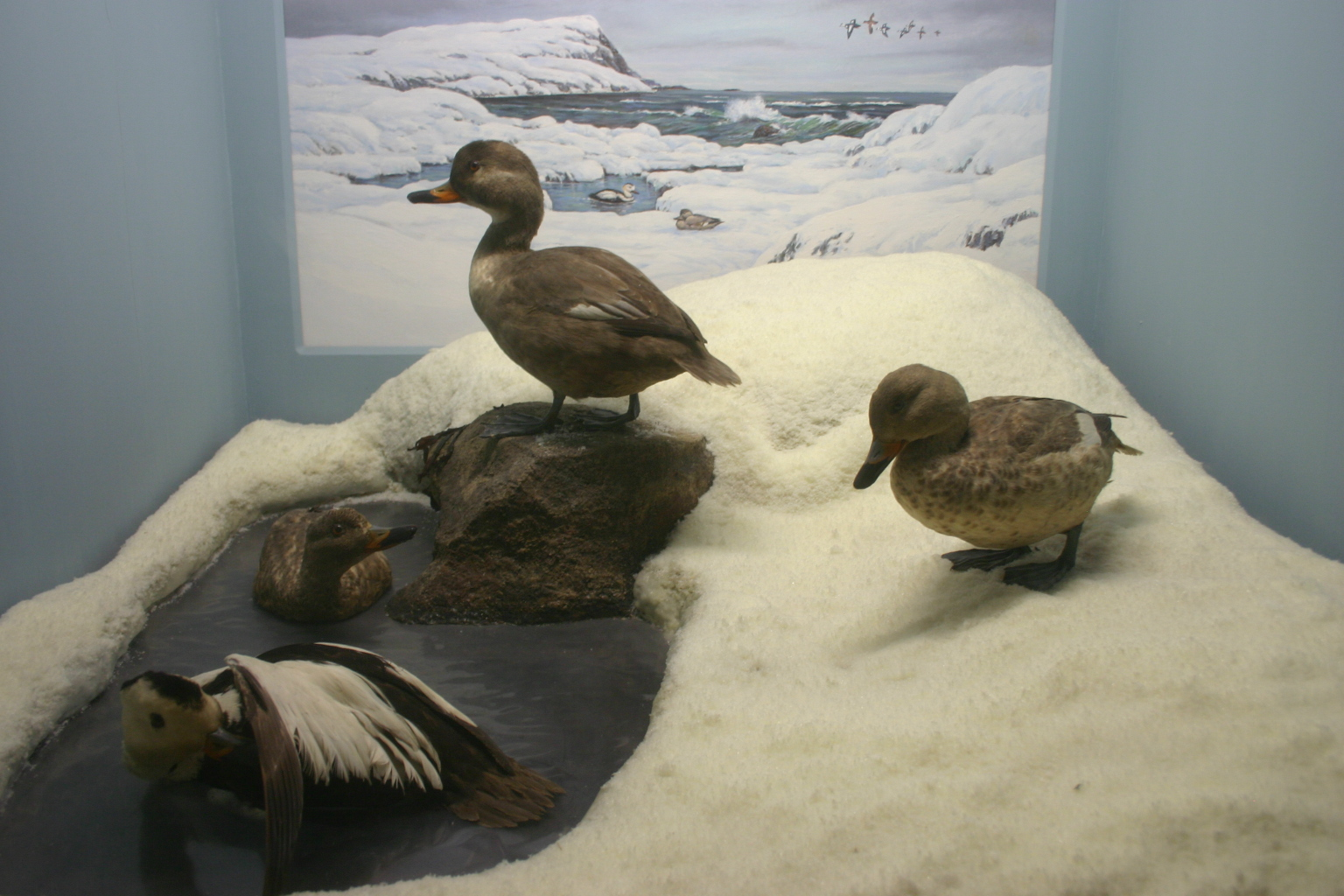
Stuffed specimens, American Museum of Natural History

Another theory that was said to lead to their extinction was a huge increase of human influence on the coastal ecosystems in North America, causing the birds to flee their niches and find another habitat. These ducks were the only birds whose range was limited to the American coast of the North Atlantic, so changing niches was a difficult task. Whatever the causes may be, the Labrador duck became extinct in the late 19th century.

== See also ==
- List of extinct birds
- List of extinct animals
