= Nushagak =

Nushagak may refer to:

- Nushagak, Alaska
- Nushagak River
- Nushagak Peninsula
- Nushagak Bay
- Nushagak (star)
