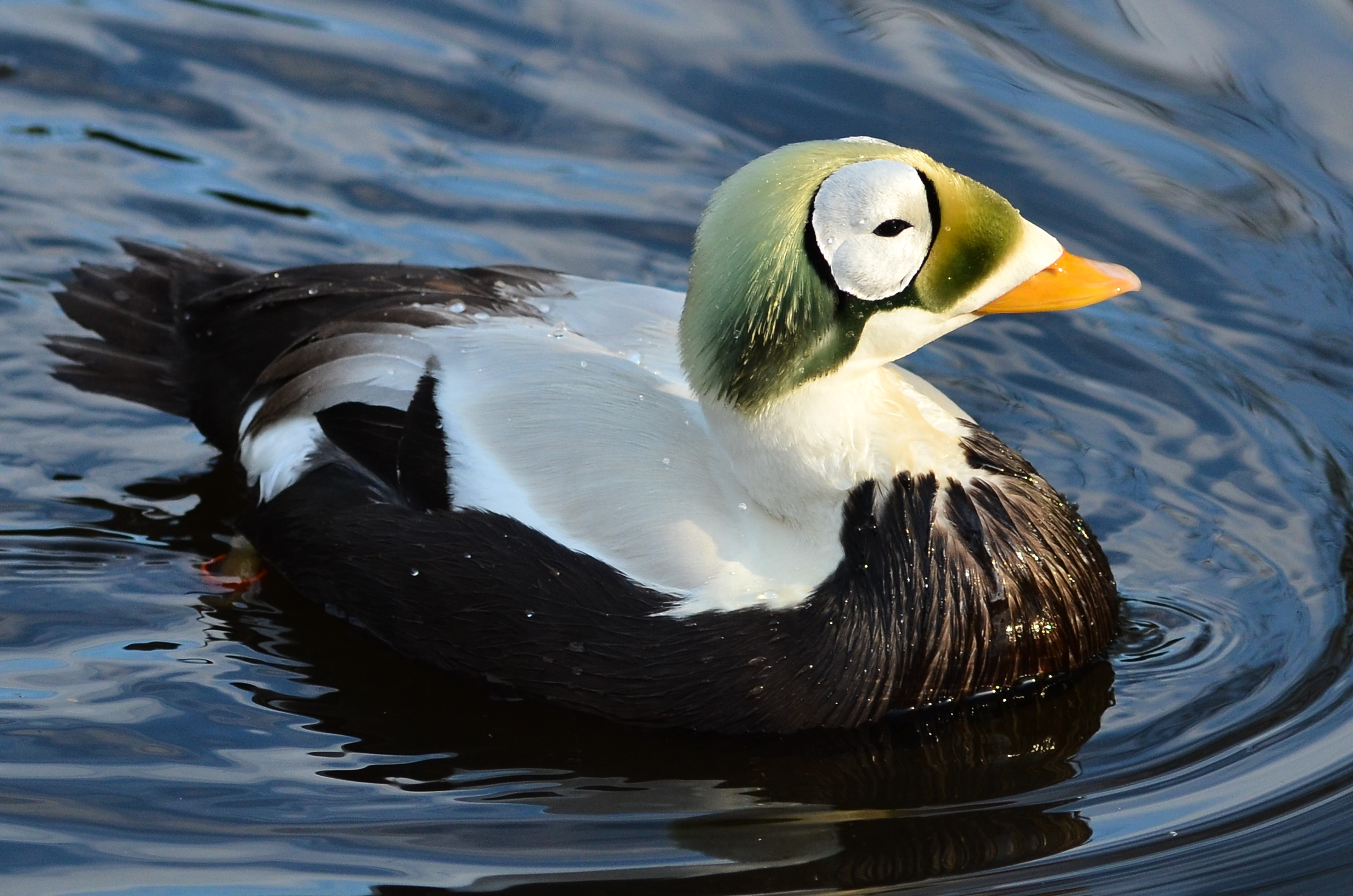
- Male at the Walsrode Bird Park, Germany
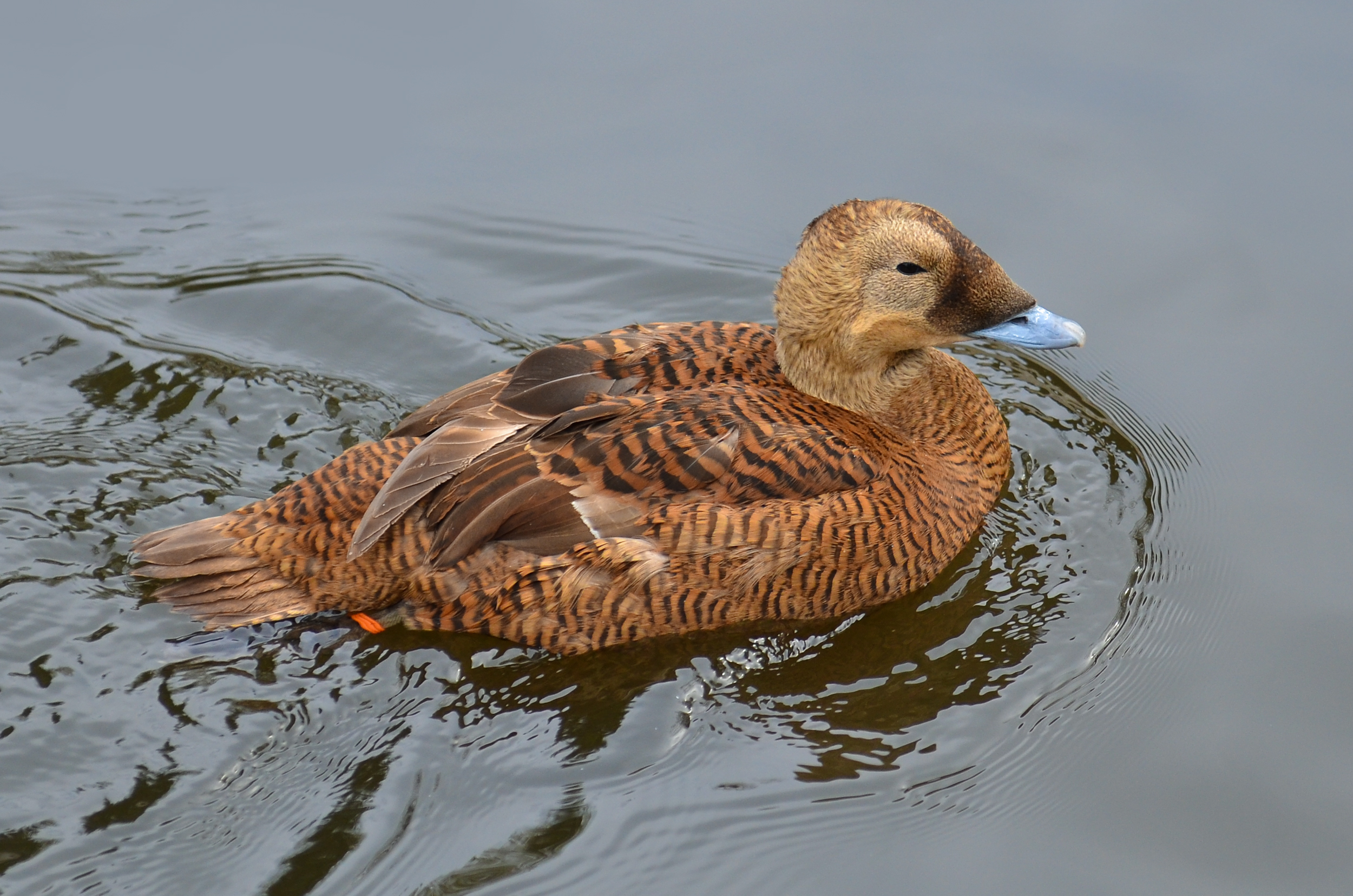
- Female at the Walsrode Bird Park, Germany

Conservation status
- Near Threatened (IUCN 3.1)

Scientific classification
- Kingdom: Animalia
- Phylum: Chordata
- Class: Aves
- Order: Anseriformes
- Family: Anatidae
- Genus: Somateria
- Species: S. fischeri

Binomial name
- Somateria fischeri (Brandt, 1847)

= Spectacled eider =

Species of northern sea duck

The spectacled eider (pronounced /ˈaɪ.dər/) (Somateria fischeri) is a large sea duck that breeds on the coasts of Alaska and northeastern Siberia.

The spectacled eider is slightly smaller than the common eider at 52–57 cm (20.5–22.5 in) in length. The male is unmistakable with its black body, white back, and yellow-green head with the large circular white eye patches which give the species its name. The drake's call is a weak crooning, and the female's a harsh croak.

The female is a rich brown bird, but can still be readily distinguished from all ducks except other eider species on size and structure. The paler goggles are visible with a reasonable view and clinch identification. Immature birds and eclipse adult drakes are similar to the female.

The binomial commemorates the German scientist Johann Fischer von Waldheim.

== Distribution ==
Spectacled eiders occur along the coast of Alaska and easternmost Russia and into the Bering Sea. There are two breeding populations in Alaska and one in Russia. Historically there were more breeding individuals in Alaska but more recently the Russian population is much larger. The United States population is an estimated 3,000–4,000 nesting pairs.

The spectacled eider molts at sea anywhere from 2 to 45 kilometers (1.2 to 28.0 mi) from the shore and north of 63°N. Since they are rarely seen outside of their breeding grounds, their wintering grounds in the Bering Sea were not known until recently with the help of satellite telemetry in 1995.

== Conservation status ==
The spectacled eider was listed as Threatened under the U.S. Endangered Species Act in 1993 but remains listed as under Least Concern on the IUCN Red List. The Red List keep the listing in this category because the spectacled eider does not meet the range size criterion or the population trend criterion. The U.S. Fish and Wildlife Service originally listed the spectacled eider as Threatened because of a more than 96% drop in breeding population size in Alaska. With this listing and protection from the Migratory Bird Treaty Act of 1991, it is illegal to harvest any individuals through either sport or subsistence hunting.

== Life history ==
As a diving duck, the spectacled eider forages for food in the water by swimming and diving underwater. It is believed to be able to remain submerged longer than most diving ducks and mostly feeds on mollusks while at sea and aquatic insects, crustaceans, and plant material while on the breeding grounds.

Breeding pairs are formed in the wintering grounds before spring migration through male displays and female selection. Once at the nesting sites, females build a nest close to the pond on a raised ridge, called a hummock, that are lined with plant materials and feathery down. Nests may be reused for future years. Females are the sole incubators and caretakers of the eggs and chicks and will lay on average three to six eggs with an olive buff color. The eggs measure 6.8 cm (2.7 in) in length and 4.5 cm (1.8 in) in width. Eggs are incubated for 24 days and chicks leave the nest shortly after hatching to be led to the water by the female. The female protects the chicks but they do find all their own food. Spectacled eiders have a fairly rapid development to be such large birds; it only takes about 53 days or less before they can fly.

== Threats ==
There are multiple factors that threaten spectacled eider populations in the future including climate change and habitat loss. Historically their range was much larger than just the coast of Alaska and Russia. It also used to extend from the Nushagak Peninsula to Barrow and almost all the way to the Canadian border. Since spectacled eiders live in frigid areas that are not easily accessible to humans their main habitat loss has been a result of climate change. A future threats to their habitat is the possible development of oil and gas drilling near Teshekpuk Lake which has well been established as a globally significant important bird area.

== Gallery ==
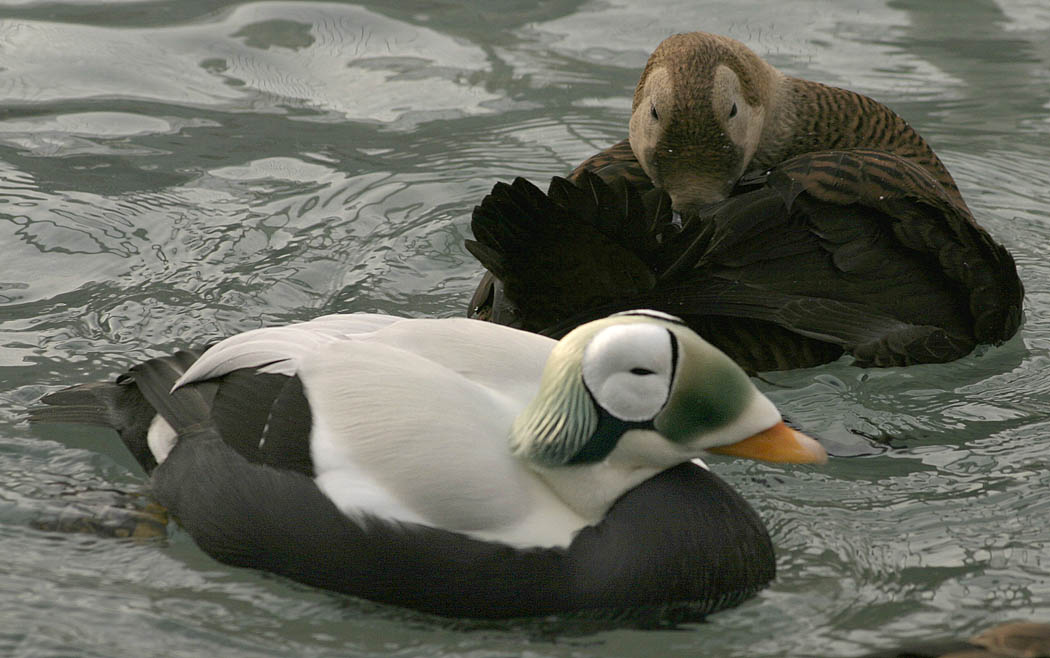
Male (front) and female (rear)

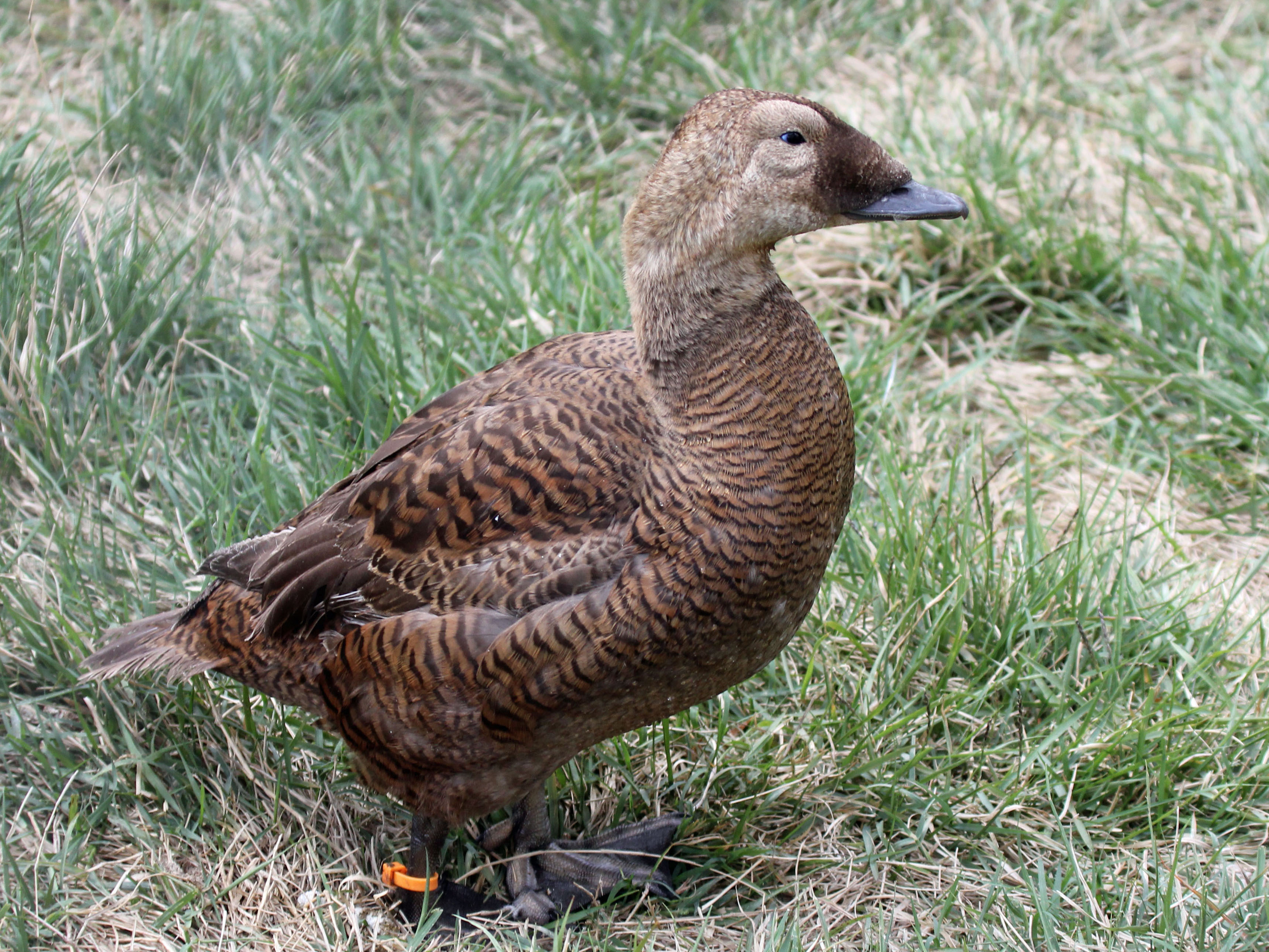
Female

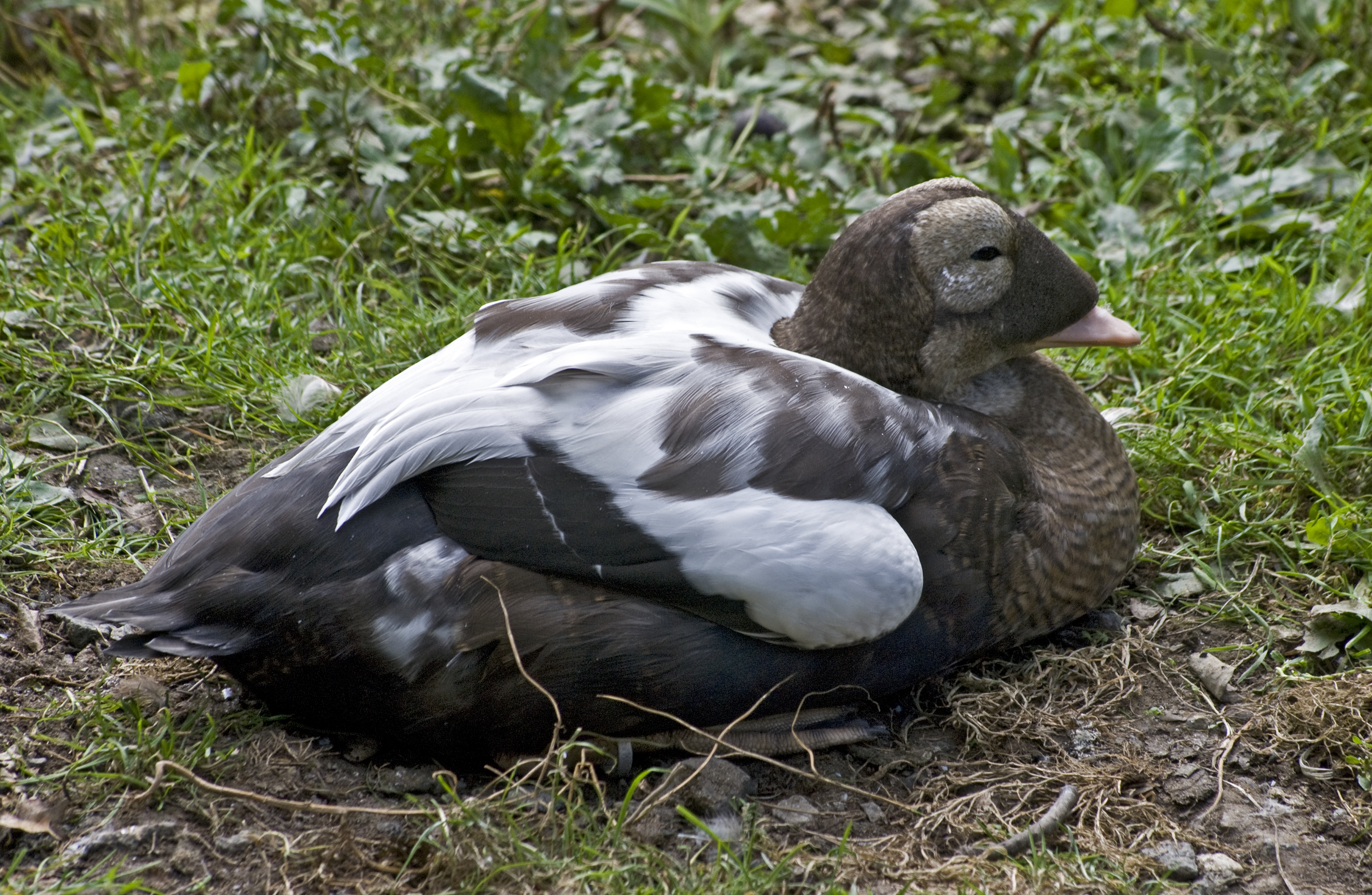
Male during eclipse molt

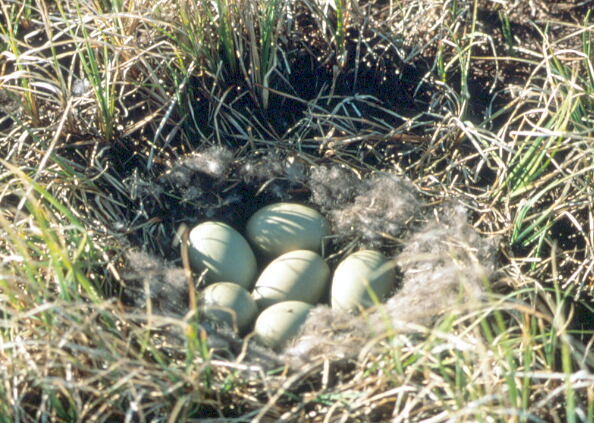
Nest of a spectacled eider
