= Cape Constantine =

Headland of Alaska, US

Coordinates: 58°23′35″N 158°53′38″W

Cape Constantine is a cape on the Nushagak Peninsula in the U.S. state of Alaska. It defines the southern side of Kulukak Bay and the eastern point of Nushagak Bay.
