= Nushagak Peninsula =

Peninsula in Alaska, United States of America

Coordinates: 58°33′09″N 158°58′32″W

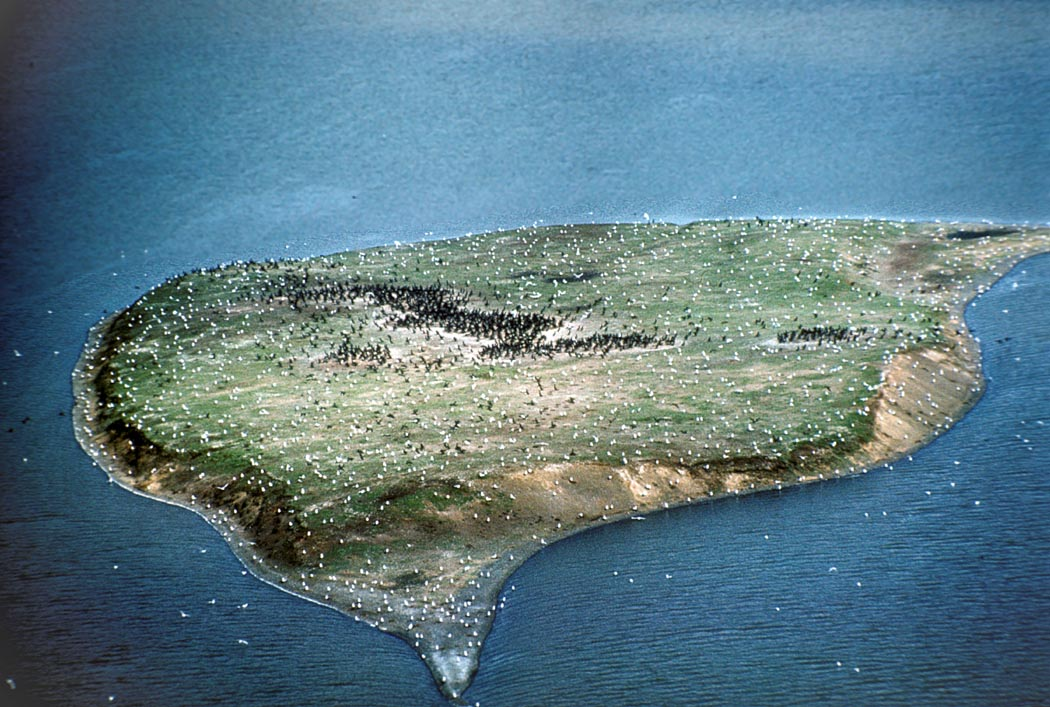
Island off the coast of the Nushagak Peninsula

The Nushagak Peninsula is an uninhabited peninsula in the U.S. state of Alaska. It is situated in the Dillingham Census Area, west of the Alaska Peninsula. The 520,000 acres (210,000 ha) byland measures 35 by 15 miles (56 km × 24 km). It was named for Nushagak Bay in 1910 by the United States Coast and Geodetic Survey. With a large area of lakes, ponds and tidal sloughs, the peninsula contains the biggest complex of wetlands of the Togiak National Wildlife Refuge.

== Geography ==
Boats and bush planes from Dillingham can reach the uninhabited peninsula. The landform separates Bristol Bay and Nushagak Bay, trending southeast to Cape Constantine. Hagemeister Island lies to the west. The Igushik River flows through the lowlands of the peninsula prior to entering the estuary of Nushagak Bay; Tuklung River is mentioned as another river. Landforms include Protection Point (a marine mammal hunting locale), Nichols Spit, and Tuklung Hills; While bars, beaches, and spits have been described along the Bristol Bay coastline. Sterling Shoal, 0.9 meters (2 ft 11 in) deep, and Ustiugof Shoal, 0.9 meters (2 ft 11 in) deep, are to the south of the landform. The lowlands of Nushagak-Bristol Bay commence at sea level and rise to 560 feet (170 m) in the proximity of the Togiak National Wildlife Refuge. Potential petroleum development was described in 1980.

== Fauna ==
Densely populated by seagulls, the peninsula is a sandhill crane nesting site and at least one bald eagle nest has been noted. Other avifauna observed are American goldeneye, American wigeon, black scoter, bufflehead, common eider, common goldeneye, common loon, common scoter, gadwall, greater scaup, green-winged teal, harlequin duck, king eider, lesser Canada goose, mallard, oldsquaw, northern pintail, northern shoveler, red-breasted merganser, red-throated loon, Steller's eider, and tundra swan. Brown bear and moose frequent the area. Beluga whale calve adjacent to the peninsula. The peninsula had been devoid of caribou for over 100 years until their reintroduction in 1988; starting with 146 in 1988, the herd numbered 1,000 in 1993, around 1,400 in 1997-98, and 500-550 in 2007.
