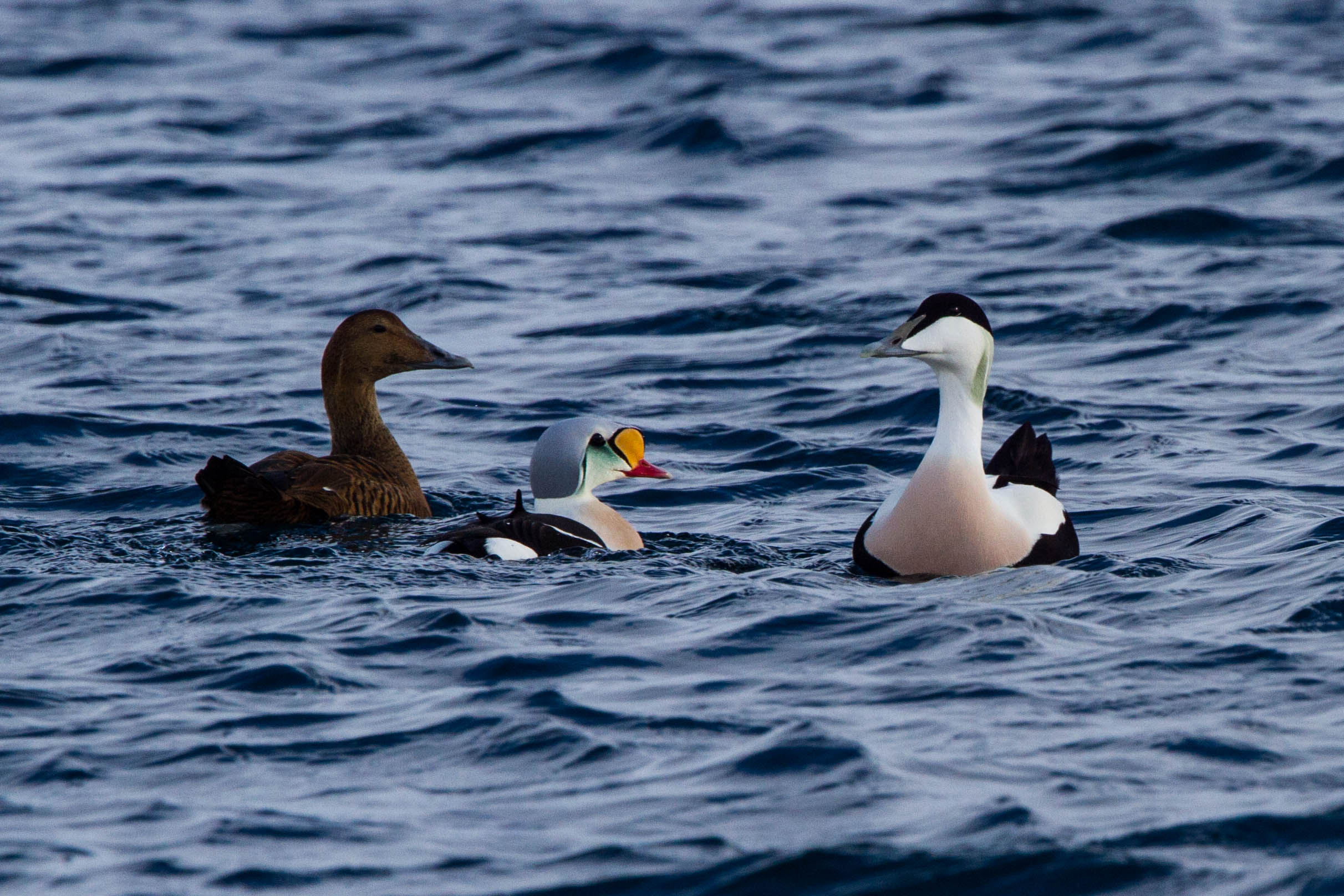
- King and common eider

Scientific classification
- Kingdom: Animalia
- Phylum: Chordata
- Class: Aves
- Order: Anseriformes
- Family: Anatidae
- Subfamily: Merginae
- Genus: Somateria; Leach, 1819

Type species
- Anas spectabilis (king eider) Linnaeus, 1758

Species
- S. mollissima; S. fischeri; S. spectabilis

Synonyms
- Eider Jarocki, 1819

= Eider =

Genus of birds

The eiders (/ˈaɪ.dər/) are large seaducks in the genus Somateria. The three extant species all breed in the cooler latitudes of the Northern Hemisphere.

The down feathers of eider ducks and some other ducks and geese are used to fill pillows and quilts—they have given the name to the type of quilt known as an eiderdown. The common eider is the source of true eider down. In Iceland and other places where the birds are native, traditional farms cultivate a relationship between the sea birds and the farmers, who collect and clean the down for sale.

== Taxonomy ==
The genus Somateria was introduced in 1819 to accommodate the king eider by the English zoologist William Leach in an appendix to John Ross's account of his voyage to look for the Northwest Passage. The name is derived from Ancient Greek σῶμα : sōma "body" (stem somat-) and ἔριον : erion "wool", referring to eiderdown.

Steller's eider (Polysticta stelleri) is in a different genus despite its name.

== Species ==
The genus contains three extant species.

Genus Somateria – Leach, 1819 – three species
Common name	Scientific name and subspecies	Range	Size and ecology	IUCN status and estimated population
Common eider Male Female	Somateria mollissima (Linnaeus, 1758) Six subspecies: S. m. v-nigrum Bonaparte & Gray, GR, 1855; S. m. borealis (Brehm, CL, 1824); S. m. sedentaria Snyder, 1941; S. m. dresseri Sharpe, 1871; S. m. faeroeensis Brehm, CL, 1831 – Faroe Islands; S. m. mollissima (Linnaeus, 1758)	northern coasts of Europe, North America and eastern Siberia	Size: Habitat: Diet:	NT
King eider Male Female	Somateria spectabilis (Linnaeus, 1758)	northeast Europe, North America and Asia	Size: Habitat: Diet:	LC
Spectacled eider Male Female	Somateria fischeri (Brandt, 1847)	coasts of Alaska and northeastern Siberia.	Size: Habitat: Diet:	LC

Two undescribed species are known from fossils, one from Middle Oligocene rocks in Kazakhstan and another from the Late Miocene or Early Pliocene of Lee Creek Mine, United States. The former may not actually belong in this genus.

== Predation ==
In Iceland, the American mink is a non-native, invasive predator that has cut eider down production by more than half. The Arctic fox is another predator of ground-nesting birds.

== Folklore ==
Since the 12th century, the black-and-white common eider has been known as Saint Cuthbert's ducks in parts of Great Britain.

== See also ==
- Barrow Duck-In, a 1961 protest against game preservation laws in Alaska, when many eider ducks were shot out-of-season to provoke mass arrests
