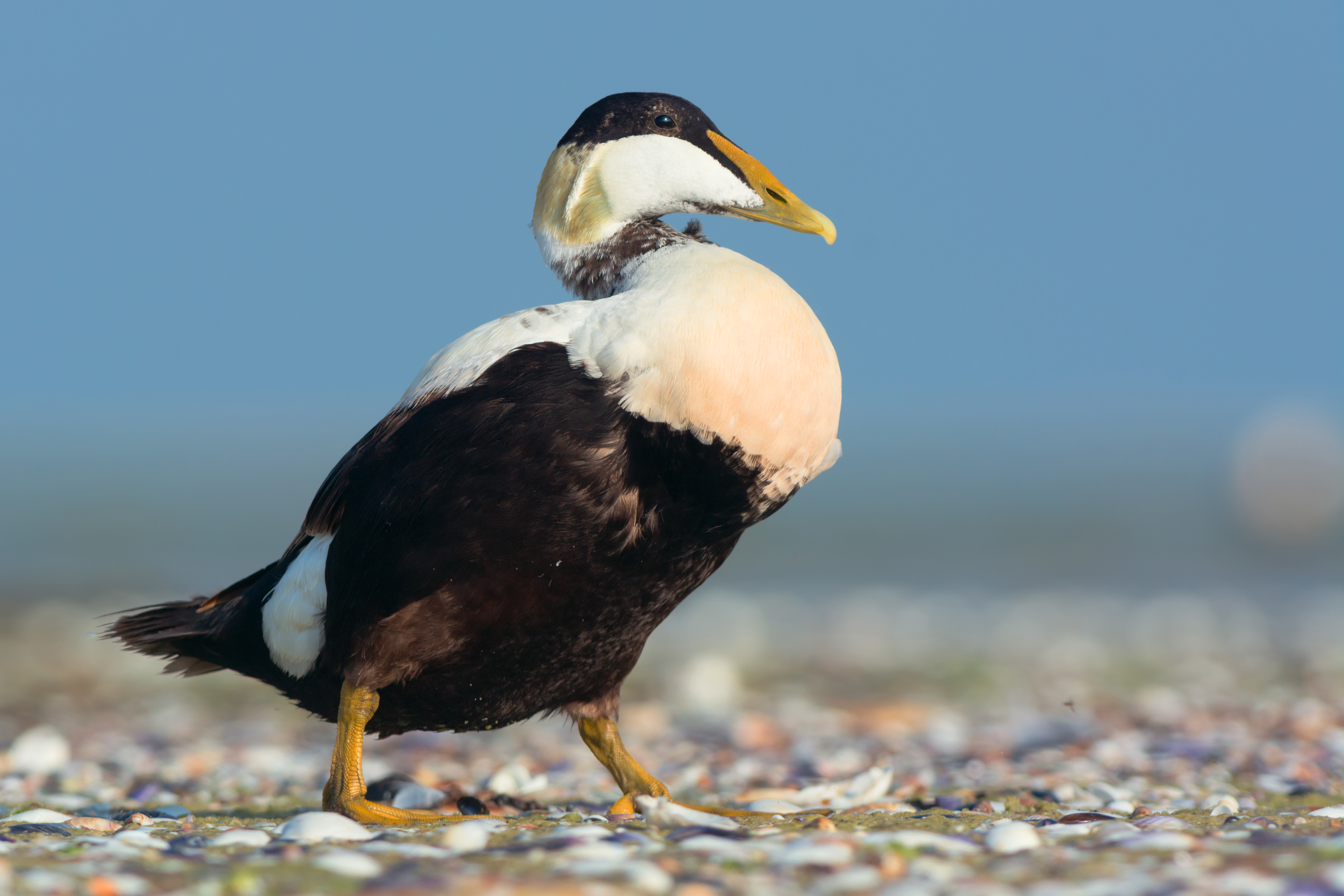
- Adult male, breeding plumage
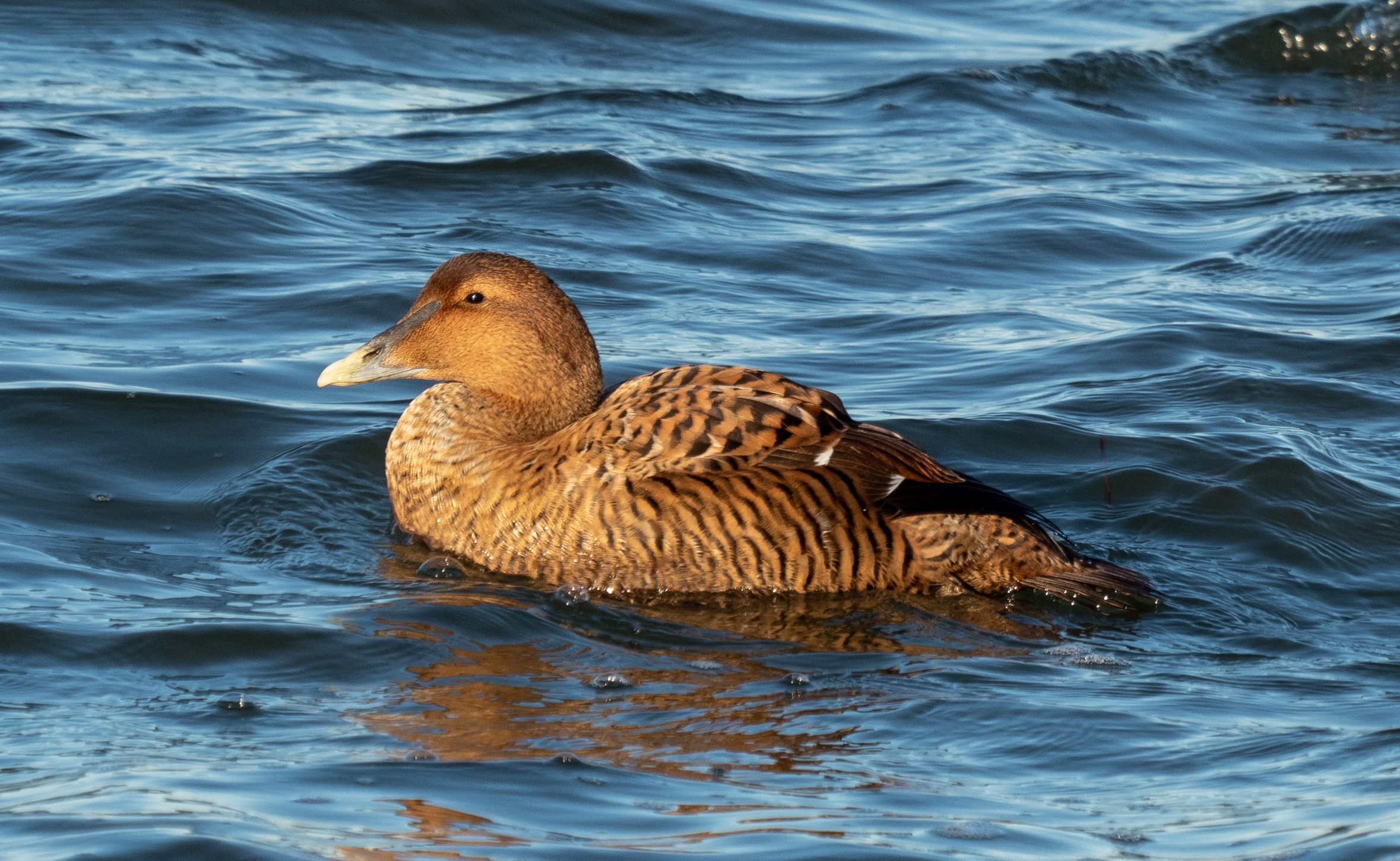
- Female

Conservation status
- Near Threatened (IUCN 3.1)

Scientific classification
- Kingdom: Animalia
- Phylum: Chordata
- Class: Aves
- Order: Anseriformes
- Family: Anatidae
- Genus: Somateria
- Species: S. mollissima

Binomial name
- Somateria mollissima (Linnaeus, 1758)

Subspecies
- S. m. mollissima (Linnaeus, 1758); S. m. faeroeensis C. L. Brehm, 1831; S. m. v-nigra Bonaparte and G.R. Gray, 1855; S. m. borealis (C. L. Brehm, 1824); S. m. sedentaria Snyder, 1941; S. m. dresseri Sharpe, 187FF99551
- Range of S. mollissima Breeding range Wintering/Feeding range

Synonyms
- Anas mollissima Linnaeus, 1758

= Common eider =

Species of bird

Common eiders in the breeding season on Texel, the Netherlands

The common eider (pronounced /ˈaɪ.dər/) (Somateria mollissima), also called St. Cuthbert's duck or Cuddy's duck, is a large (50–71 cm (20–28 in) in body length) sea-duck that is distributed over the northern coasts of Europe, North America and eastern Siberia. It breeds in Arctic and some northern temperate regions, but winters somewhat farther south in temperate zones, when it can form large flocks on coastal waters. It can fly at speeds up to 113 km/h (70 mph).

The eider's nest is built close to the sea and is lined with eiderdown, plucked from the female's breast. This soft and warm lining has long been harvested for filling pillows and quilts, but in more recent years has been largely replaced by down from domestic farm-geese and synthetic alternatives. Although eiderdown pillows or quilts are now a rarity, typically being marketed as luxury goods, eiderdown harvesting continues and is sustainable, as it can be done after the ducklings leave the nest with no harm to the birds.

== Taxonomy ==
The common eider was formally named by the Swedish naturalist Carl Linnaeus in 1758 in the tenth edition of his Systema Naturae. He placed it with all the other ducks in the genus Anas and coined the binomial name Anas mollissima. It is now placed with two other species in the genus Somateria that was introduced in 1819 by the English zoologist William Leach. The genus name is derived from Ancient Greek σῶμα sōma 'body' (stem somat-) and ἔριον erion 'wool'. The specific mollissimus is Latin, meaning 'very soft'. Both parts of the name refer to its down feathers.

=== Subspecies ===
Six subspecies are recognised:

- S. m. v-nigrum Bonaparte & Gray, GR, 1855 – breeds in northeast Asia and Alaska; winters in the Bering Sea and the Aleutian Islands
- S. m. borealis (Brehm, CL, 1824) – breeds in northeast Canada, Greenland and Iceland; winters in the north Atlantic
- S. m. sedentaria Snyder, 1941 – breeds in Hudson Bay and James Bay (Canada)
- S. m. dresseri Sharpe, 1871 – breeds in southeast Canada and northeast US; winters around northwest Atlantic coasts
- S. m. faeroeensis Brehm, CL, 1831 – Faroe Islands, endemic
- S. m. mollissima (Linnaeus, 1758) – breeds in northwest Eurasia and locally in central Europe (lakes in the Alps) and the northern Black Sea (Crimea); winters in northwest and central Europe

== Description ==
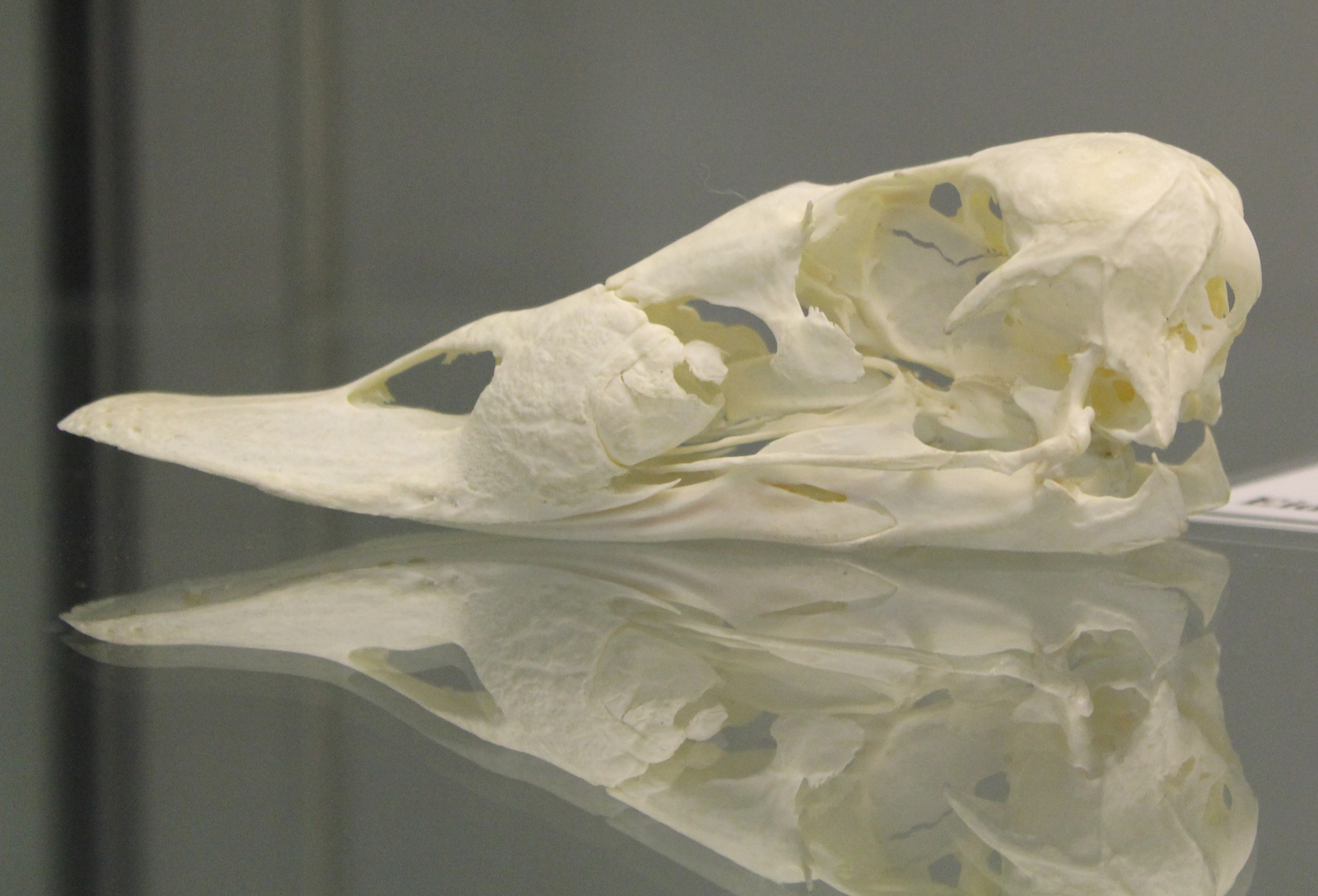
A common eider skull

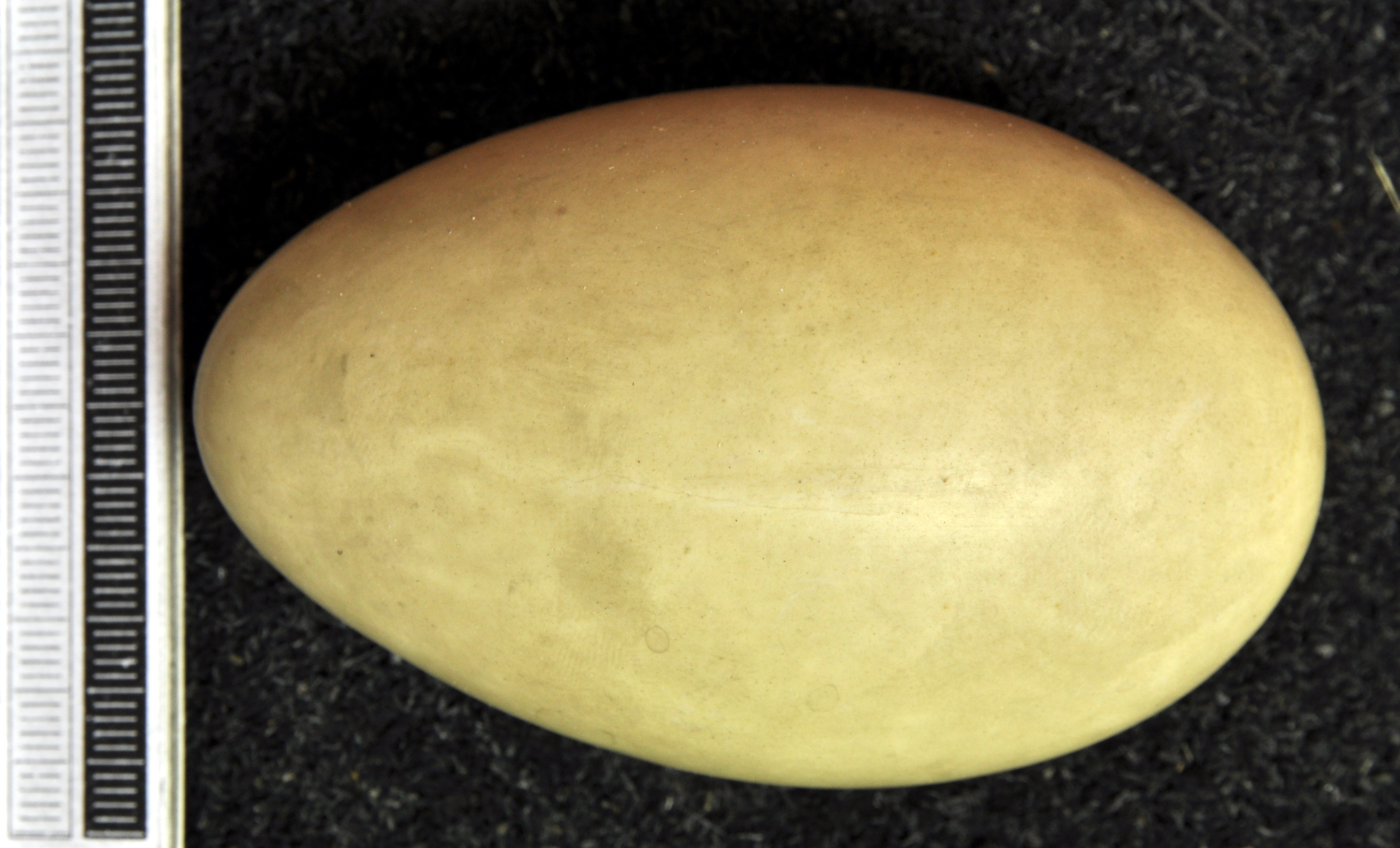
Egg, Collection Museum Wiesbaden

The common eider is the largest of the four eider species, measuring 50 to 71 cm (19 1/2 to 28 in) in length, weighs 0.81 to 3.04 kg (1 lb 12 1/2 oz to 6 lb 11 oz) and spans 80–110 cm (31–43 in) across the wings. The average weight of 22 males in the North Atlantic was 2.21 kg (4 lb 14 oz) while 32 females weighed an average of 1.92 kg (4 lb 3 1/2 oz). It is distinguished by its bulky shape and large, wedge-shaped bill. The male is distinct, with its black and white plumage and green nape. The female is a brown bird, but can still be readily distinguished from all ducks, except other eider species, on the basis of size and head shape. The drake's display call is a strange almost human-like "ah-ooo", while the duck utters hoarse quacks. The species is often readily approachable.

Drakes of the European, Asian, and eastern and western North American subspecies can be distinguished by small differences in plumage and bill colour. Nominate S. m. mollissima has a yellowish-green bill, while S. m. dresseri has a greenish-grey bill, as does the slightly smaller S. m. faeroeensis. The Arctic Atlantic S. m. borealis and the Arctic Pacific S. m. v-nigrum have bright orange-yellow bills.

== Ecology ==
This species dives for crustaceans and molluscs, with mussels being a favoured food. The eider will eat mussels by swallowing them whole; the shells are then crushed in their gizzard and excreted. When eating a crab, the eider will remove all of its claws and legs, and then eat the body in a similar fashion.

It is abundant, with populations of about 1.5–2 million birds in both North America and Europe, and also large but unknown numbers in eastern Siberia (HBW). Some populations are small and declining, notably the isolated Crimean population in the Black Sea is declining and of conservation concern, with only around 700–1,100 pairs.

A particularly famous colony of eiders lives on the Farne Islands in Northumberland, England. About 1,000 pairs still nest there every year. It has been claimed that these birds were the subject of one of the first-ever bird protection laws, and that the first wildlife preserve was established for them by Saint Cuthbert in the year 676, though this is not likely to be true. No mention of the hermit having any affinity with birds is found in any documents until the publication of a story about 500 years after his death. The stories told in these later works also do not involve any concerns about habitat loss or other concepts in modern nature conservation. Because St. Cuthbert is the patron saint of Northumberland, it was natural that the eider should be chosen as the county's emblem bird; the birds are still often called St Cuthbert's ducks or Cuddy's ducks in the area (Cuddy is the familiar form of Cuthbert).

In land-locked Switzerland, a small population (around five pairs) of this normally strictly marine species has colonised some of the larger lakes since 1988, enabled by the presence of large numbers of the invasive freshwater zebra mussel, which is sufficiently similar to its natural diet for eiders to breed far inland.

In Canada's Hudson Bay, important eider die-offs were observed in the 1990s by local populations due to quickly changing ice flow patterns. The Canadian Wildlife Service has spent several years gathering up-to-date information on their populations, and preliminary results seem to show a population recovery. The common eider is the object of the 2011 documentary People of a Feather, which studies the historical relationship between the Sanikiluaq community and eiders, as well as various aspects of their ecology.

The common eider is one of the species to which the Agreement on the Conservation of African-Eurasian Migratory Waterbirds (AEWA) applies.

The clutch consists of 3 to 8 eggs, each measuring 7.55–7.84 cm (3.0–3.1 in) in length and 4.92–5.28 cm 1.9–2.1 in width. The eggs are incubated for 24–26 days.

== Social behaviour ==
Eiders are colonial breeders. They nest on coastal islands in colonies ranging in size of less than 100 to upwards of 15,000 individuals. Female eiders frequently exhibit a high degree of natal philopatry, where they return to breed on the same island where they were hatched. This can lead to a high degree of relatedness between individuals nesting on the same island, as well as the development of kin-based female social structures. This relatedness has likely played a role in the evolution of co-operative breeding behaviours amongst eiders. Examples of these behaviours include laying eggs in the nests of related individuals and crèching, where female eiders team up and share the work of rearing ducklings.

== Gallery ==
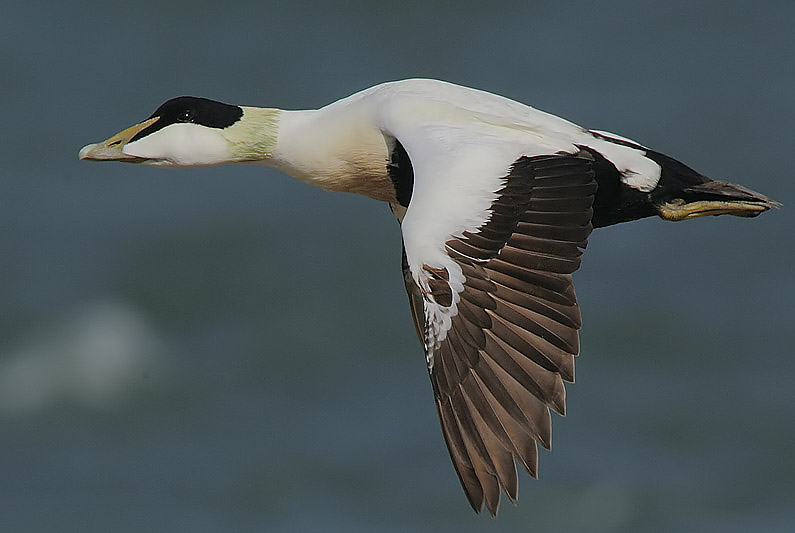
Male in flight

Female in flight, Northern Ireland

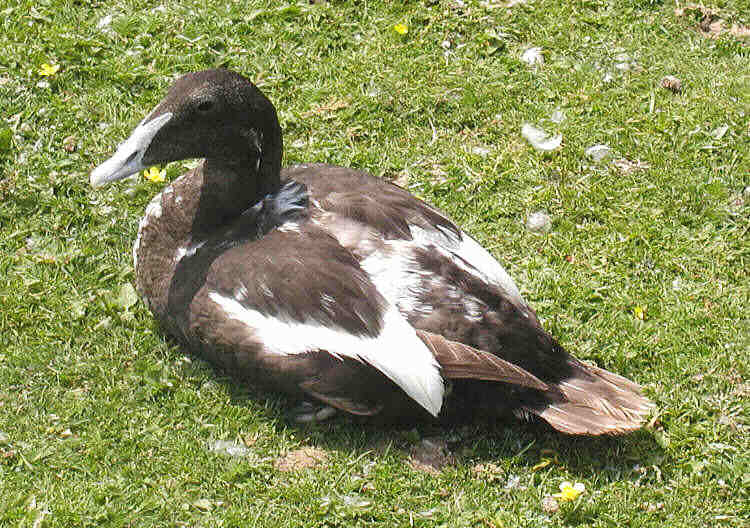
Adult male in eclipse plumage

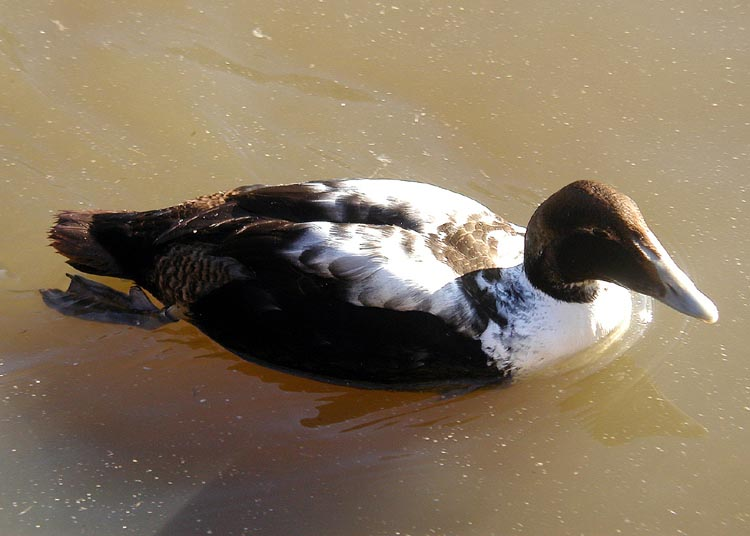
Male juvenile in first winter plumage, similar but different from eclipse plumage

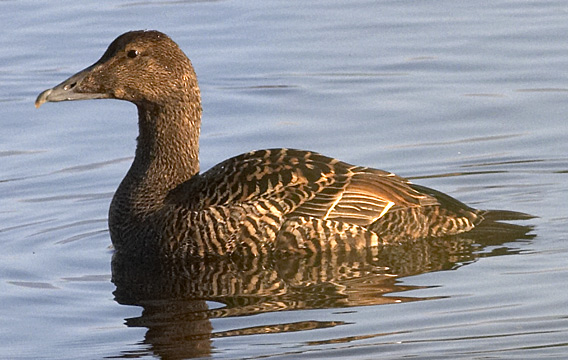
Female

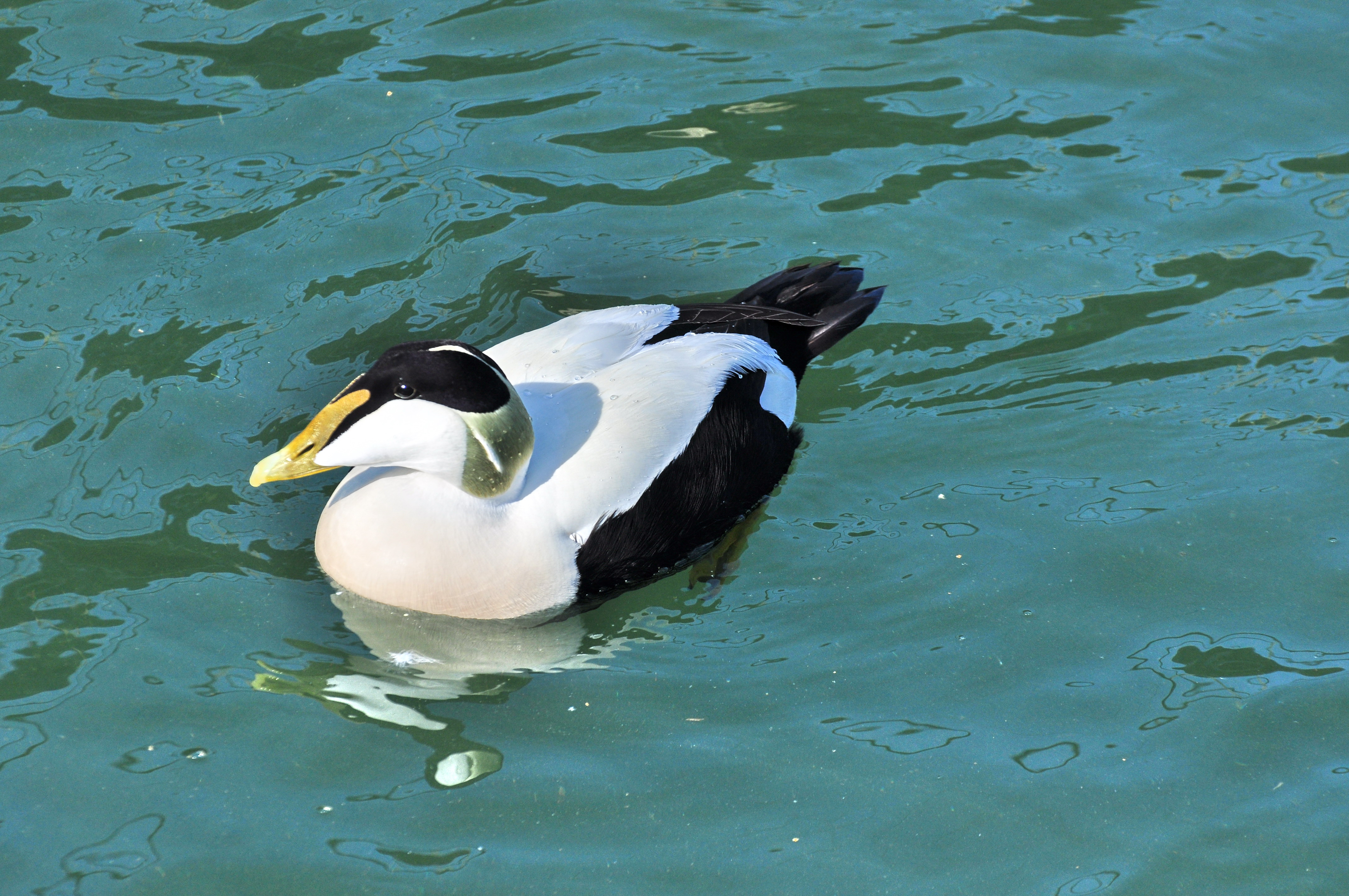
Common eider on Lake Zürich Obersee, Switzerland

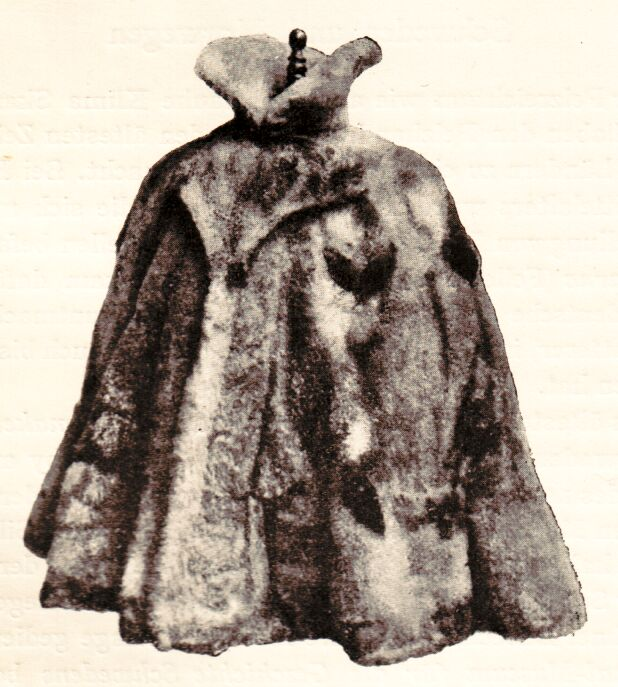
Eider duck skin coat

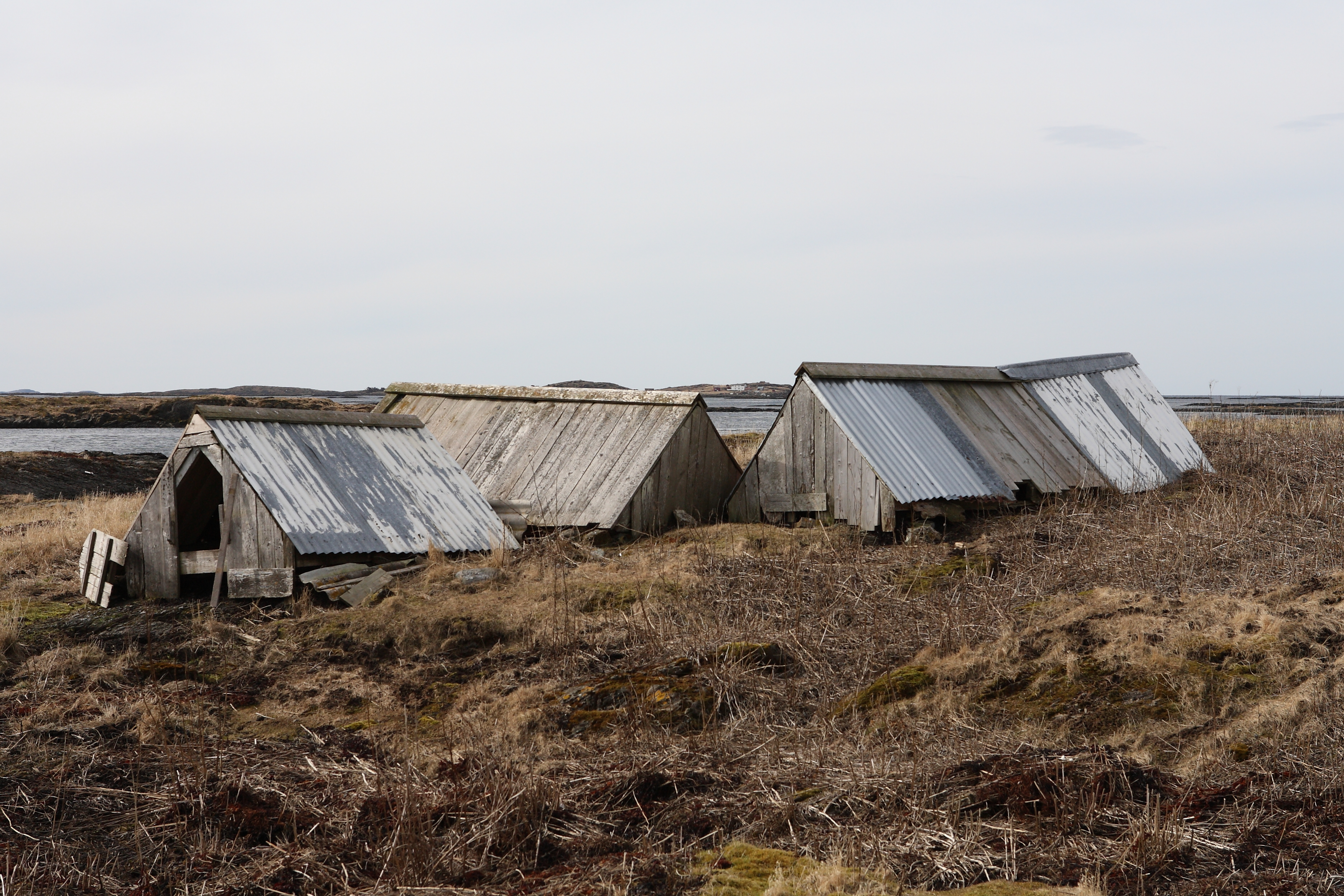
Traditional man-made eider nesting boxes

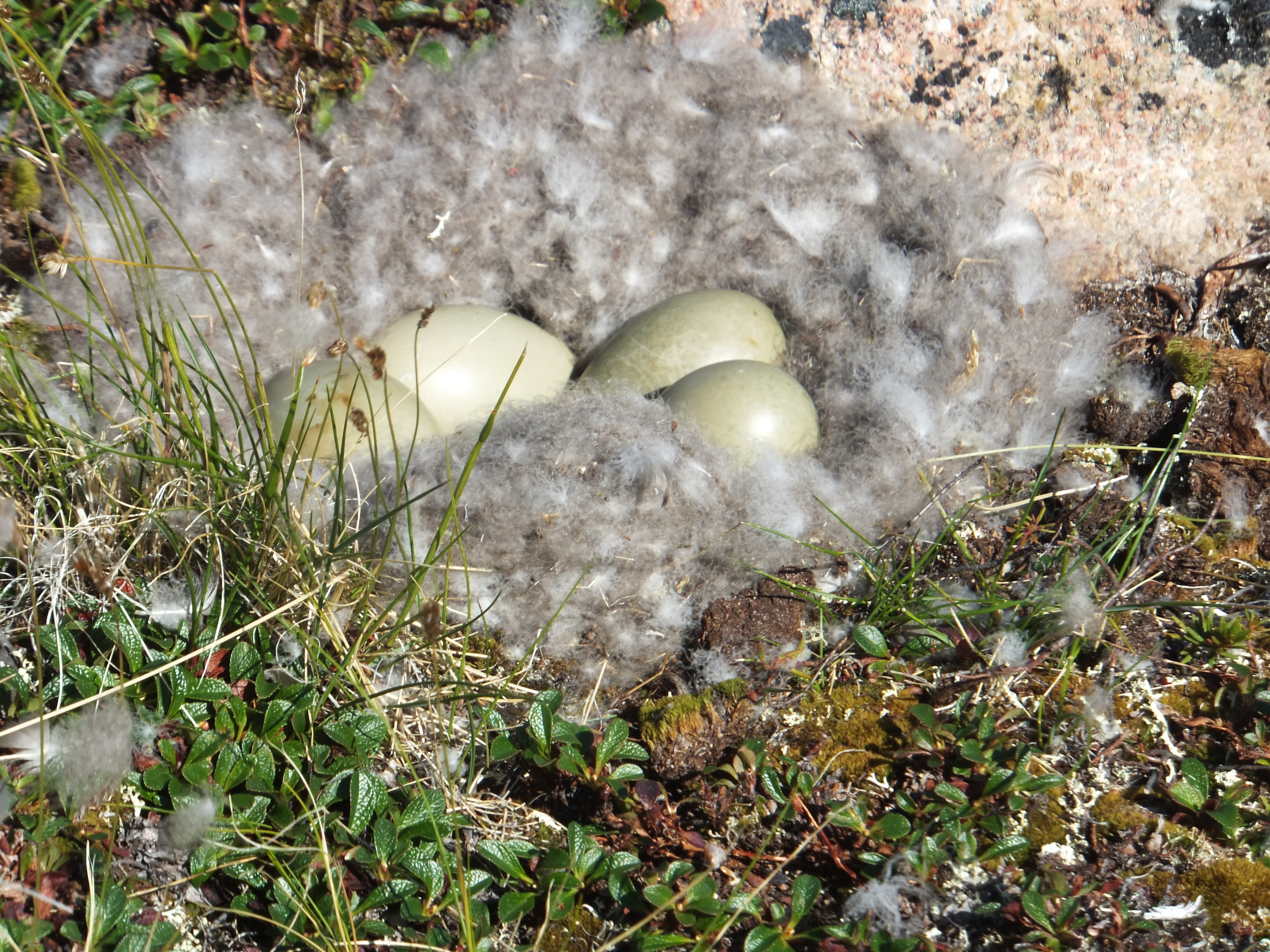
Eider nest on the tundra in the Canadian Arctic

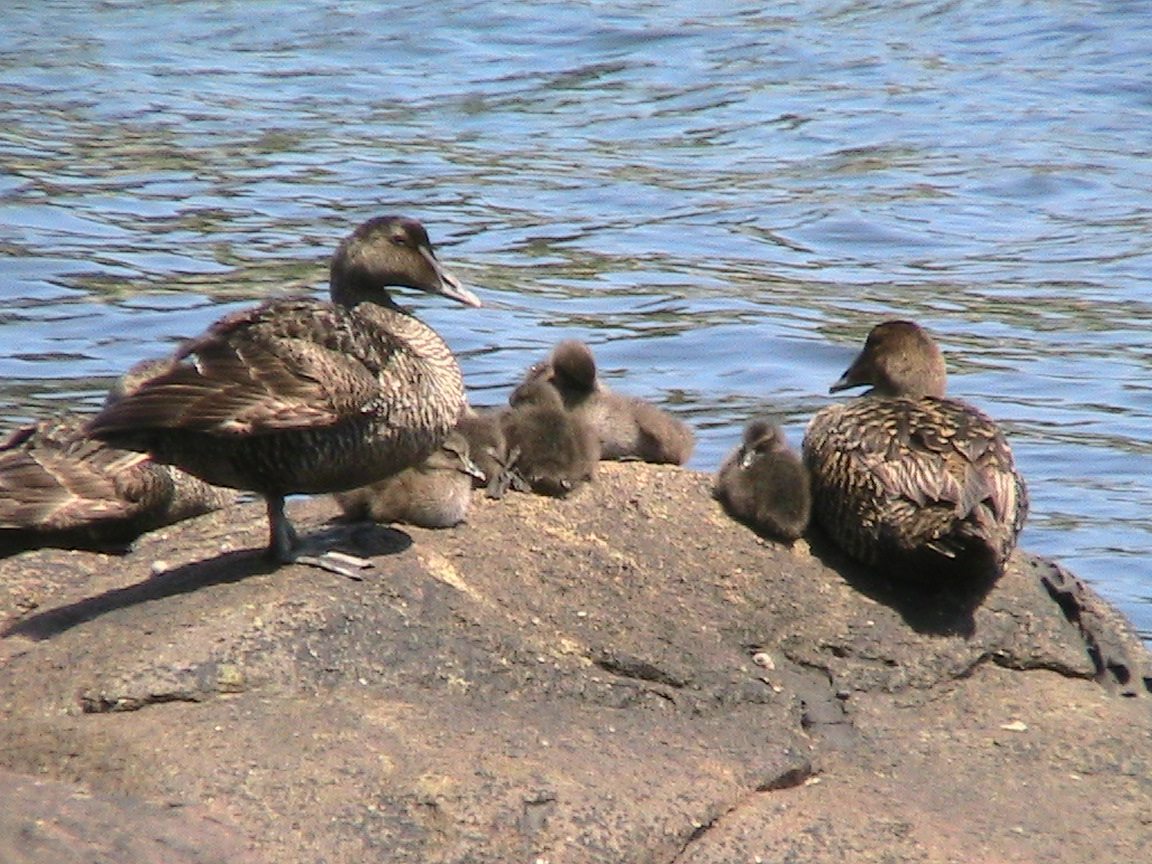
Small eider creche: three adult females over six ducklings at Biddeford Pool, Maine

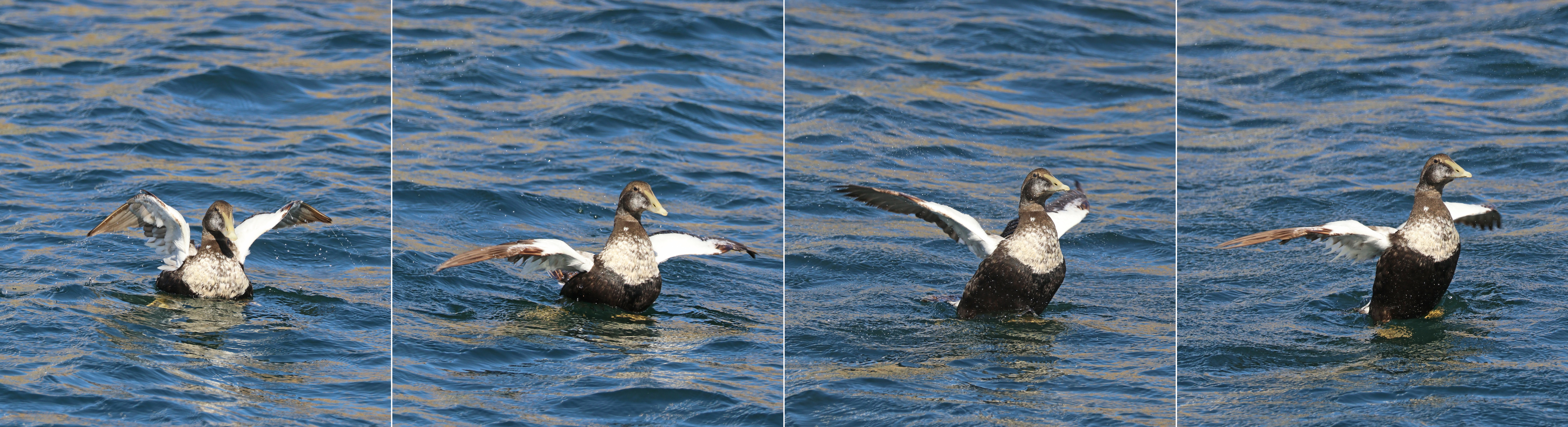
Stretching

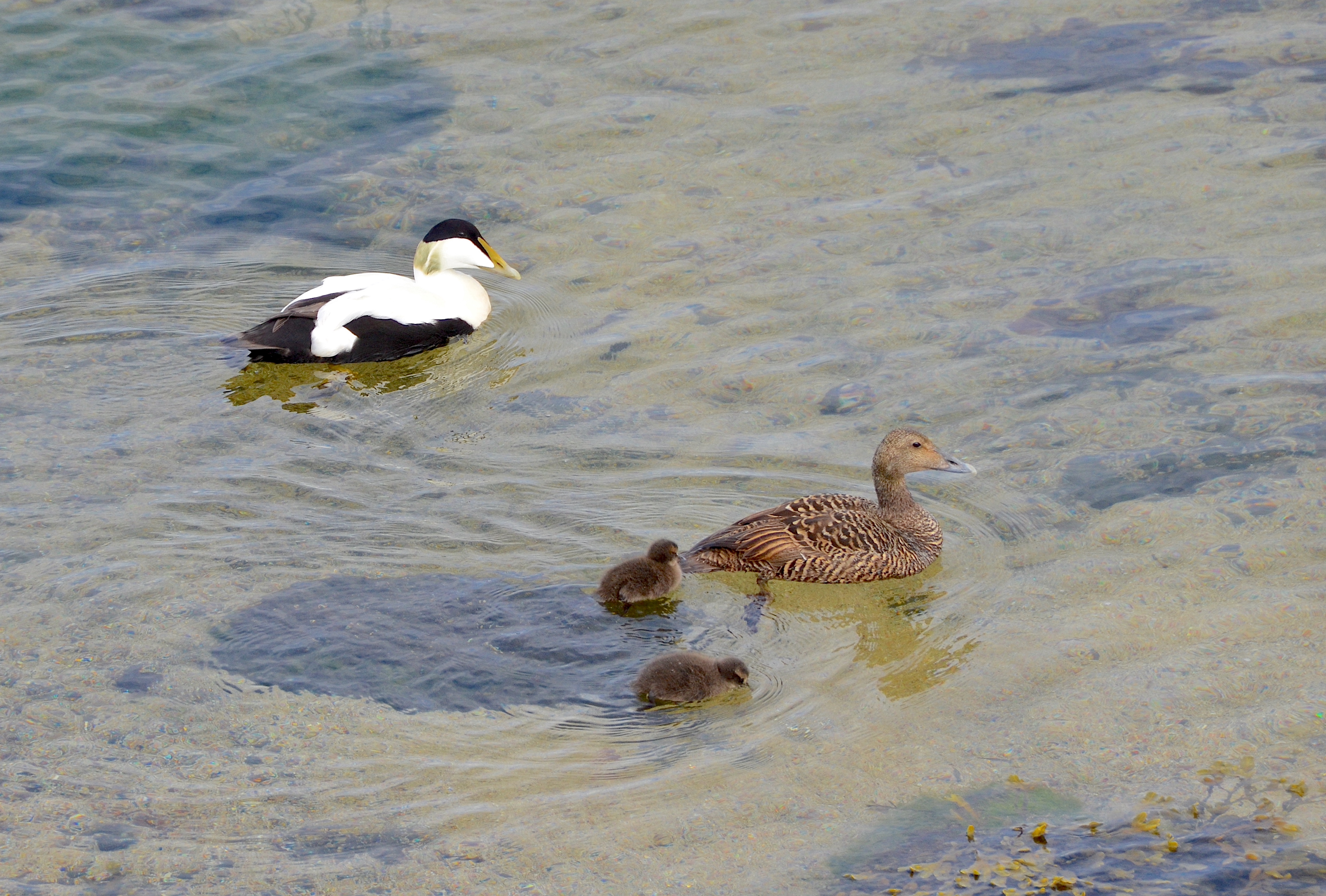
Common eider with ducklings swimming

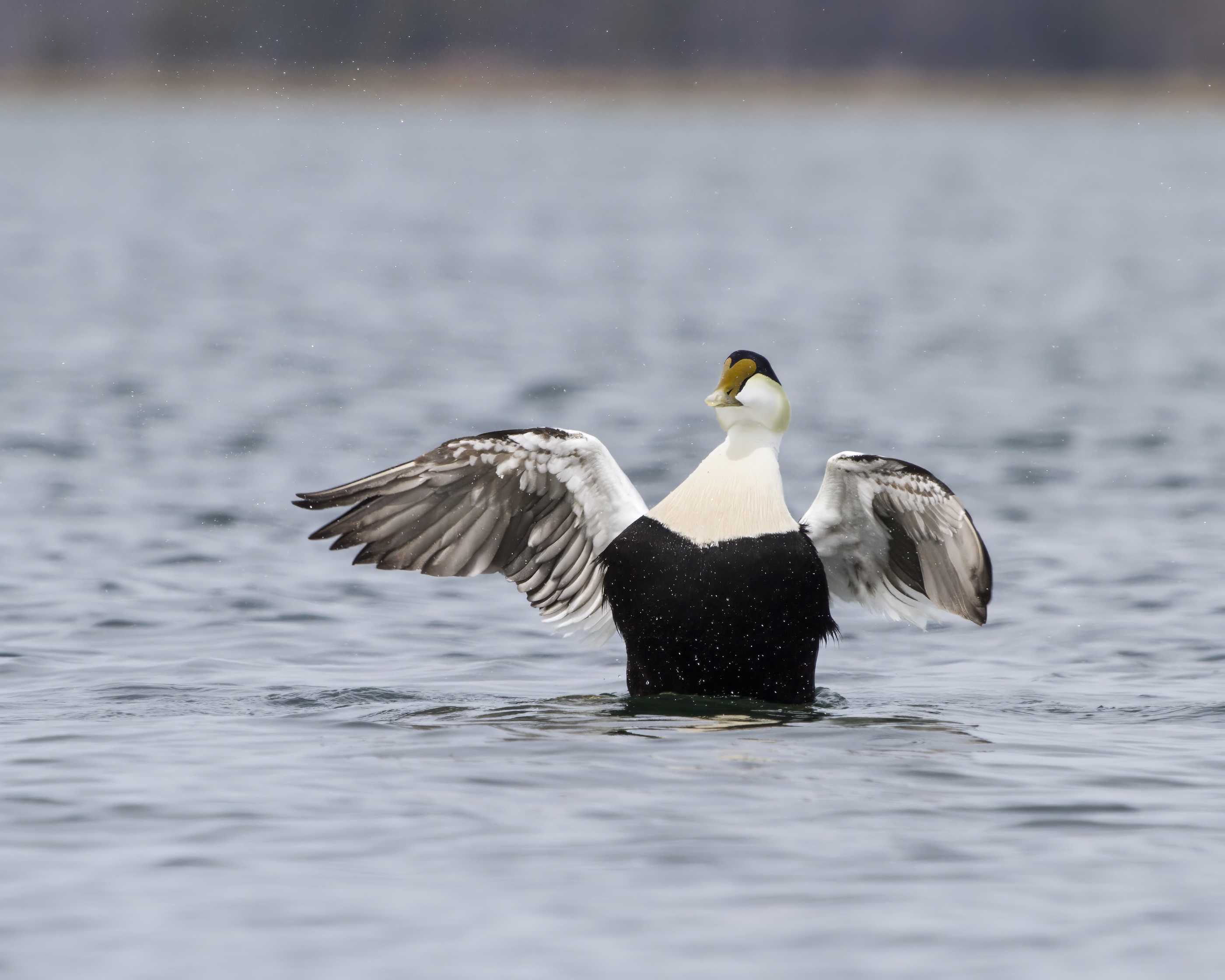
A Drake Common Eider in the Nonesuch River, Scarborough, Maine
