= Andrew Jackson Kirk =

American politician

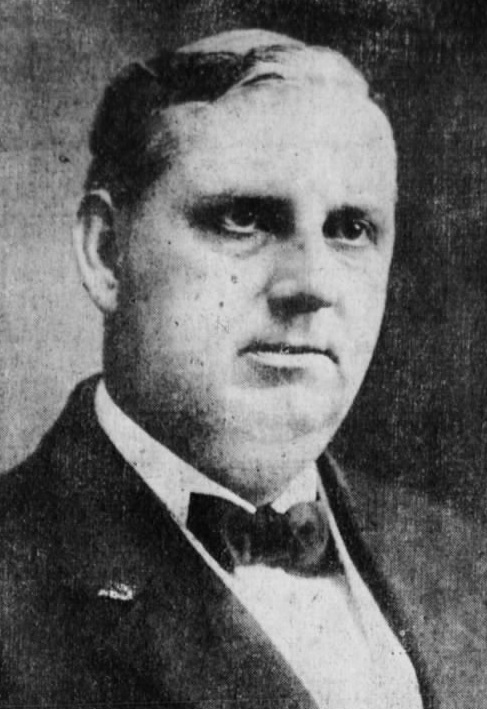
- Kirk, c. 1912

Member of the U.S. House of Representatives from Kentucky's 10th district
- In office February 13, 1926 – March 3, 1927
- Preceded by: John W. Langley
- Succeeded by: Katherine Gudger Langley

Judge of Kentucky's 24th Judicial Circuit
- In office 1904–1916

Commonwealth Attorney of Kentucky's 24th Judicial Circuit
- In office 1898–1904

County Attorney of Martin County
- In office 1894–1898

Personal details
- Born: March 19, 1866 Warfield, Kentucky
- Died: May 25, 1933 (aged 67) Paintsville, Kentucky
- Party: Republican
- Education: Valparaiso University

Andrew Jackson Kirk (March 19, 1866 – May 25, 1933) was an American lawyer and politician who served part of one term as a U.S. representative from Kentucky in 1926 and 1927.

== Early life and career ==
Born near Warfield, Kentucky, Kirk attended the common schools. He graduated from the law department of Valparaiso University (Indiana) in 1890. He was admitted to the bar the same year and commenced practice in Inez, Kentucky. He served as county attorney of Martin County 1894–1898, and as commonwealth attorney for the twenty-fourth judicial district of Kentucky 1898–1904. He was circuit judge of the same district 1904–1916. He resumed the practice of law in Jenkins, Letcher County, and in Paintsville, Kentucky, in 1918.

== Congress ==
Kirk was elected as a Republican to the Sixty-ninth Congress to fill the vacancy caused by the resignation of John W. Langley and served from February 13, 1926, to March 3, 1927. He was an unsuccessful candidate for renomination in 1926 when he was defeated by Langley's wife.

== Later career and death ==
He resumed the practice of law in Paintsville, Kentucky. He was a Republican candidate for nomination as circuit judge at the time of his death in Paintsville, Kentucky, May 25, 1933.

He was interred in Kirk Cemetery near Inez, Kentucky.

U.S. House of Representatives
Preceded by John W. Langley	Member of the U.S. House of Representatives from Kentucky's 10th congressional district February 13, 1926 – March 3, 1927 (obsolete district)	Succeeded by Katherine G. Langley
