= National Register of Historic Places listings in Martin County, Kentucky =

Location of Martin County in Kentucky

This is a list of the National Register of Historic Places listings in Martin County, Kentucky.

It is intended to be a complete list of the properties on the National Register of Historic Places in Martin County, Kentucky, United States. The locations of National Register properties for which the latitude and longitude coordinates are included below, may be seen in a map.

There are 3 properties listed on the National Register in the county.

This National Park Service list is complete through NPS recent listings posted December 19, 2025.

== Current listings ==
	Name on the Register	Image	Date listed	Location	City or town	Description
1	Martin Himler House	Martin Himler House	November 21, 1991 (#91001667)	West of the junction of Kentucky Routes 40 and 2031; 37°50′24″N 82°26′22″W	Beauty	
2	Inez Deposit Bank		January 10, 2024 (#100009727)	25 Main Street; 37°52′00″N 82°32′19″W	Inez	
3	Martin County Courthouse	Martin County Courthouse	September 15, 2006 (#06000811)	10 Courthouse Street; 37°51′58″N 82°32′21″W	Inez	

== See also ==
- List of National Historic Landmarks in Kentucky
- National Register of Historic Places listings in Kentucky
