= Sheldon Clark High School =

Location
- Inez, Kentucky; United States; 37.8604°N 82.5336°W

Information
- Type: Public high school
- Established: 1972
- Closed: 2019
- School district: Martin County School System
- Principal: Martha Williams
- Grades: 9-12
- Enrollment: 544 (2016-17)
- Colors: Red and Columbia Blue
- Team name: Cardinals
- Yearbook: Poems Prayers & Promises
- Website: www.martin.kyschools.us/1/Home

Sheldon Clark High School (SCHS) was a public high school in unincorporated Martin County, Kentucky, USA, near Inez. It was a part of the Martin County School System.

It was named after Martin County Schools Superintendent Sheldon Clark when both Warfield High School and Inez High School was consolidated in 1972. As of 2017 Martha Williams is the principal. The original Sheldon Clark High School building had to be abandoned after nearby road construction blasting resulted in structural damage, with the school then being housed in a middle school building until a new high school could be built. Construction of the new school, Martin County High School, started in 2016 with the school opening for the 2019–2020 school year.

== Sports ==
- American football
- Baseball
- Basketball
- Cheerleading
- Fishing
- Golf
- Soccer
- Softball
- Tennis
- Track and field
- Volleyball
- Wrestling

== Clubs ==
- Academic team
- Environmental club
- Future Business Leaders of America
- Fellowship of Christian Athletes
- Family, Career and Community Leaders of America
- Kentucky Junior Historical Society
- Band
- Jobs For America's Graduates www.jag.org
- Cardinal Broadcasting Network
- Journalism
- Junior Reserve Officers' Training Corps
