= Warfield, Kentucky =

- City
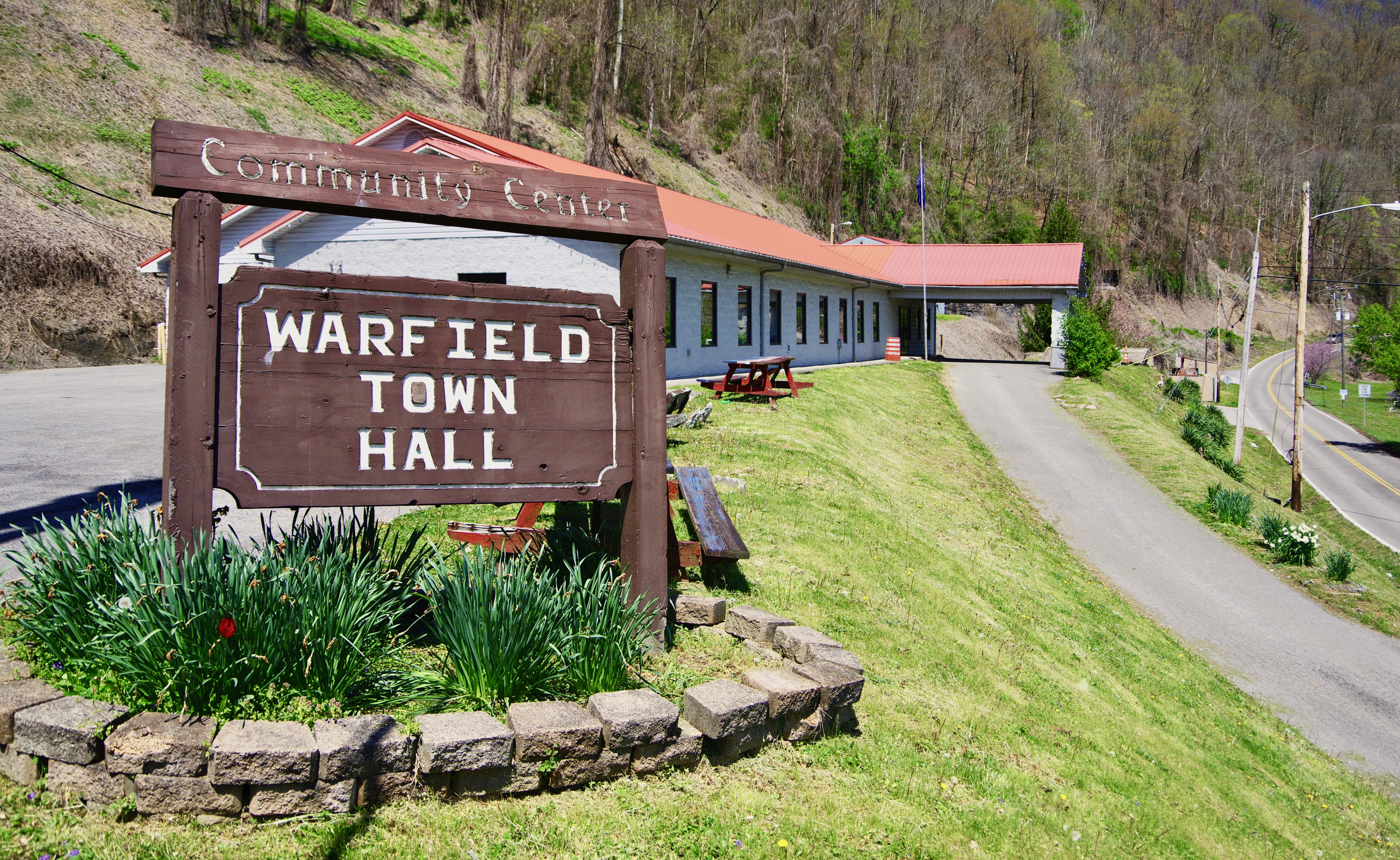
- Town Hall in Warfield

- Location in Martin County, Kentucky
- Coordinates: 37°50′29″N 82°25′21″W
- Country: United States
- State: Kentucky
- County: Martin
- Incorporated: May 5, 1982

Government
  - Type: City Commission
  - Mayor: Michael Hinkle

Area
  - Total: 0.84 sq mi (2.17 km^{2})
  - Land: 0.83 sq mi (2.14 km^{2})
  - Water: 0.012 sq mi (0.03 km^{2})
- Elevation: 702 ft (214 m)

Population (2020)
  - Total: 264
  - Density: 320.0/sq mi (123.55/km^{2})
- Time zone: UTC-5 (Eastern (EST))
  - Summer (DST): UTC-4 (EDT)
- ZIP code: 41267
- Area code: 606
- FIPS code: 21-80616
- GNIS feature ID: 2405671

Warfield is a home rule-class city in Martin County, Kentucky, United States. The population was 264 at the 2020 census.

== History ==
The city of Warfield developed in the early 1850s after a salt works was established by George Rogers Clark Floyd and John Warfield of Virginia. The post office was established on April 15, 1856, and was named after the latter of the two men. Floyd further developed the city as the shipping point for his coal mine, the first to open in future Martin County. Warfield served as the county seat from 1870 to 1873, when it was moved to Inez.

== Geography ==
Warfield is located in eastern Martin County. The town lies along the west bank of Tug Fork, which is the boundary between Kentucky and West Virginia. The town of Kermit, West Virginia, lies across the river to the east. The two cities are connected by a vehicular bridge and an abandoned railroad bridge. Just west of Warfield lies the community of Beauty.

Warfield is concentrated around the intersection of Kentucky Route 40 and Kentucky Route 292. KY 40 leads west 9 miles (14 km) to Inez and 32 miles (51 km) to Paintsville. KY 292 runs roughly north to south alongside the Tug Fork: Louisa is 31 miles (50 km) to the north (downstream), while Williamson, West Virginia, is 20 miles (32 km) to the southeast (upstream).

According to the United States Census Bureau, Warfield has a total area of 0.84 square miles (2.18 km^{2}), of which 0.01 square miles (0.03 km^{2}), or 1.32%, are water.

== Demographics ==
Historical population
Census	Pop.	Note	%±
1880	54		—
1940	296		—
1950	324		9.5%
1960	295		−9.0%
1970	236		−20.0%
1990	364		—
2000	284		−22.0%
2010	269		−5.3%
2020	264		−1.9%
U.S. Decennial Census

As of the census of 2000, there were 284 people, 120 households, and 78 families residing in the city. The population density was 300.1 inhabitants per square mile (115.9/km^{2}). There were 153 housing units at an average density of 161.7 per square mile (62.4/km^{2}). The racial makeup of the city was 100.00% White. Hispanic or Latino of any race were 0.35% of the population.

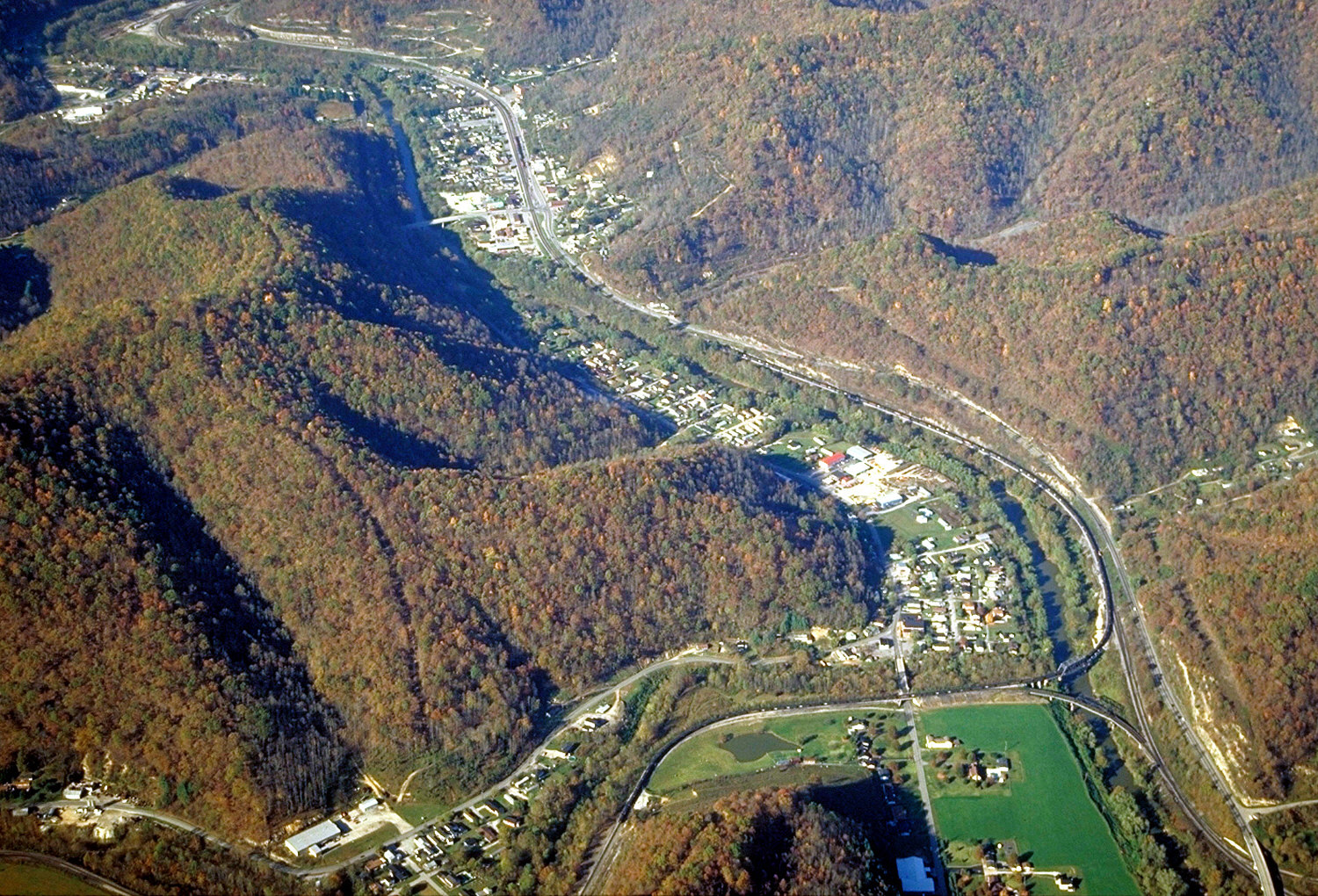
Aerial view of the Tug Fork; Warfield is visible at the top-left of the photo, on the left side of the river.

There were 120 households, out of which 20.0% had children under the age of 18 living with them, 51.7% were married couples living together, 10.8% had a female householder with no husband present, and 34.2% were non-families. 30.8% of all households were made up of individuals, and 15.0% had someone living alone who was 65 years of age or older. The average household size was 2.37 and the average family size was 2.96.

In the city, the population was spread out, with 20.4% under the age of 18, 10.6% from 18 to 24, 28.9% from 25 to 44, 26.1% from 45 to 64, and 14.1% who were 65 years of age or older. The median age was 41 years. For every 100 females, there were 98.6 males. For every 100 females age 18 and over, there were 83.7 males.

The median income for a household in the city was $21,786, and the median income for a family was $30,000. Males had a median income of $33,125 versus $38,125 for females. The per capita income for the city was $12,208. About 28.9% of families and 35.4% of the population were below the poverty line, including 54.4% of those under the age of eighteen and 12.0% of those 65 or over.

== Education ==
The school district is Martin County School System.
