= Martin County Courthouse =

Martin County Courthouse may refer to:

- Old Martin County Courthouse, Stuart, Florida
- Martin County Courthouse (Indiana), Shoals, Indiana
- Martin County Courthouse (Kentucky), Inez, Kentucky
- Martin County Courthouse (Minnesota), Fairmont, Minnesota
- Martin County Courthouse (North Carolina), Williamston, North Carolina
