= Big Sandy Area Development District =

- Company type: Non-Profit
- Founded: February 10, 1972
- Headquarters: Prestonsburg, Kentucky
- Area served: Floyd, Johnson, Magoffin, Martin, and Pike counties
- Key people: Sandy Runyon (Executive Director)
- Services: Economic and Community Development, Community Services, Aging and Disability Services, and Housing Services
- Parent: Kentucky Council of Area Development Districts
- Website: bigsandy.org

The Big Sandy Area Development District (BSADD) is a regional planning and development organization that focuses on economic and community development, community services, aging and disability services, and housing services for a five-county region in Eastern Kentucky. The five counties served within the region includes Floyd, Johnson, Magoffin, Martin, and Pike Counties. The BSADD office is located at 110 Resource Court in Prestonsburg, Kentucky.

== History ==
The concept of area development districts within the state of Kentucky was first visualized by Governor Bert T. Combs in 1961. By 1967, the state was divided into 15 districts. BSADD received designation and funding from the Appalachian Regional Commission and the U.S. Department of Commerce, Economic Development Administration in 1968. On February 10, 1972, the BSADD, along with the other 14 development districts, were established by the Kentucky General Assembly.

== Demographics ==
As of the census of 2000, 160,532 people, 63,396 households, and 46,976 families were residing in the district. The population density was 80.8 people per square mile (31.2 people/km^{2}). The racial makeup of the district was 97.38% White, 0.59% African American, 0.12% Native American, 0.29% Asian, 0.04% Pacific Islander, 0.09% from other races, and 0.59% from two or more races. Hispanics or Latinos of any race were 1.23% of the population.

Of the 63,396 households, 36.98% had children under 18 living with them, 58.71% were married couples living together, 11.71% had a female householder with no husband present, 2.13% were not families, and 23.77% were made up of individuals. The average household size was 2.49 and the average family size was 2.94.

The age distribution was 24.3% under 18, 9.4% from 18 to 24, 29.9% from 25 to 44, 24.6% from 45 to 64, and 12% who were 65 or older. The median age was 36.6 years. For every 100 females, there were 81.9 males.

== See also ==
- Southwest Tennessee Development District
