= Ajax, West Virginia =

Unincorporated community in West Virginia, United States

Ajax
- Unincorporated community
- Location within the state of West Virginia
- Coordinates: 37°48′9″N 82°18′17″W
- Country: United States
- State: West Virginia
- County: Mingo
- Elevation: 646 ft (197 m)
- Time zone: UTC-5 (Eastern (EST))
  - Summer (DST): UTC-4 (EDT)
- FIPS code: 1553703

Ajax is an unincorporated community located in Mingo County, West Virginia, United States. It was previously known as Himler because it was founded as a company town by the Himler Coal Company.

== See also ==
- Himlerville, Kentucky
- Martin Himler House
