= Martin County Schools =

Martin County Schools may refer to:

- Martin County School District (Florida)
- Martin County School System (Kentucky)
- Martin County Schools (North Carolina)
