= Pásztó =

Town in Hungary

- Town
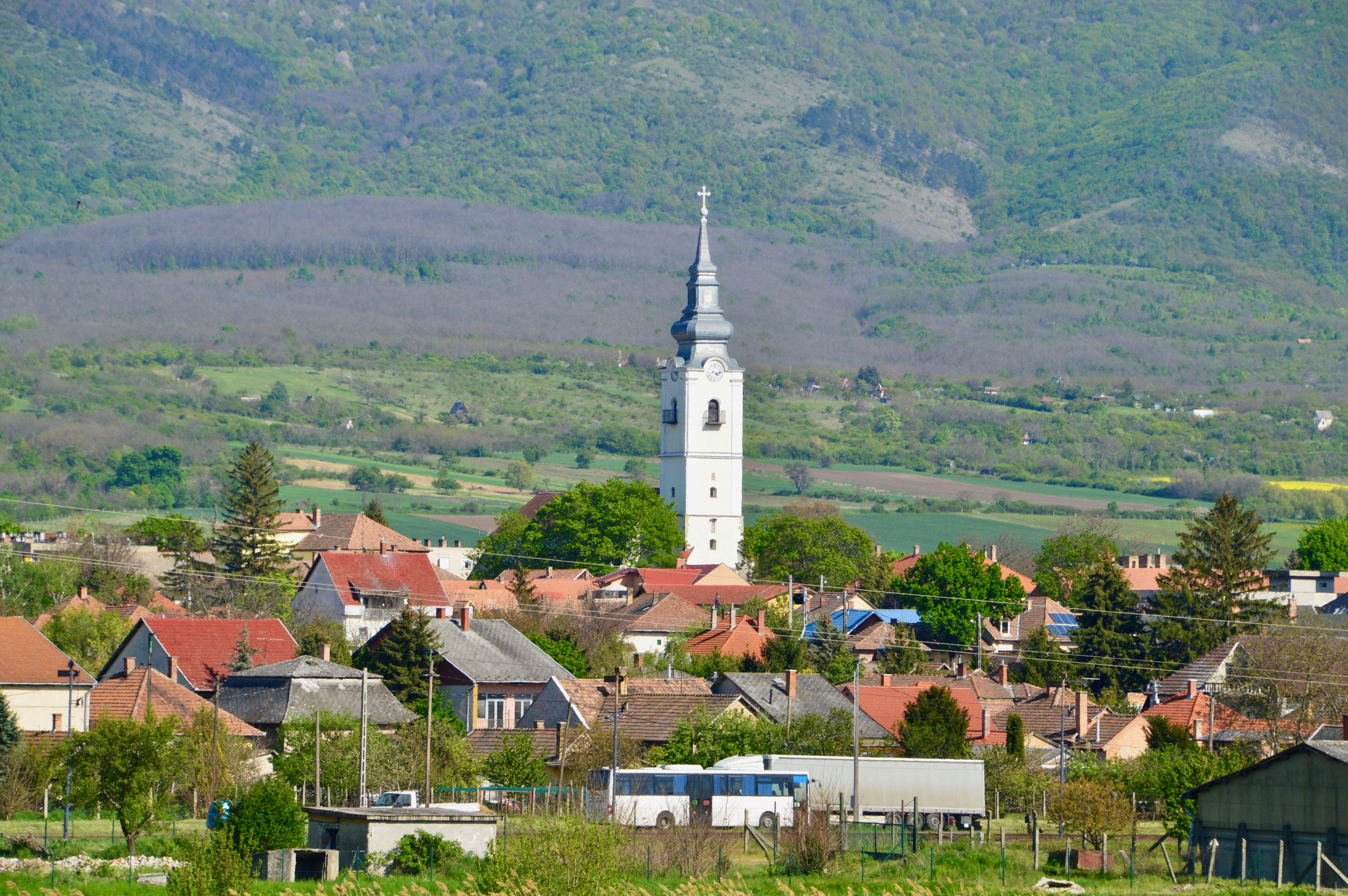
- Saint Lawrence church

- Flag Coat of arms

- Location in Hungary
- Coordinates: 47°55′10″N 19°41′52″E
- Country: Hungary
- County: Nógrád
- District: Pásztó
- Establishment: 1190
- Founder: King Béla III

Government
  - Mayor: Gábor Dömsödi (Ind.)

Area
  - Total: 72.60 km^{2} (28.03 sq mi)

Population (2022)
  - Total: 8,664
  - Density: 119.3/km^{2} (309.1/sq mi)
- Time zone: UTC+1 (CET)
  - Summer (DST): UTC+2 (CEST)
- Postal code: 3060, 3065, 3082
- Area code: 32
- Website: www.paszto.hu

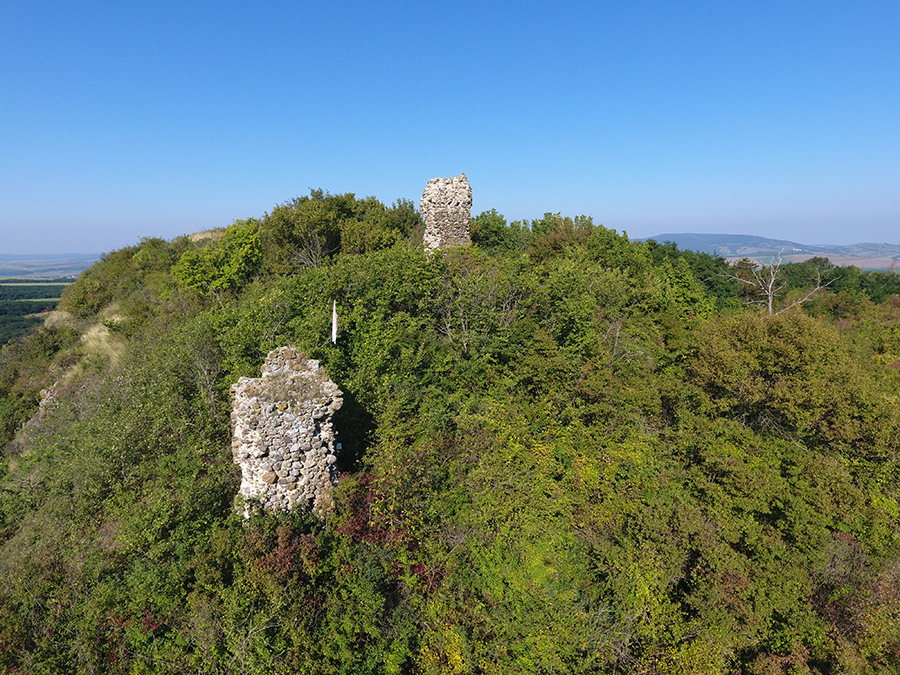
Hasznos castle ruins

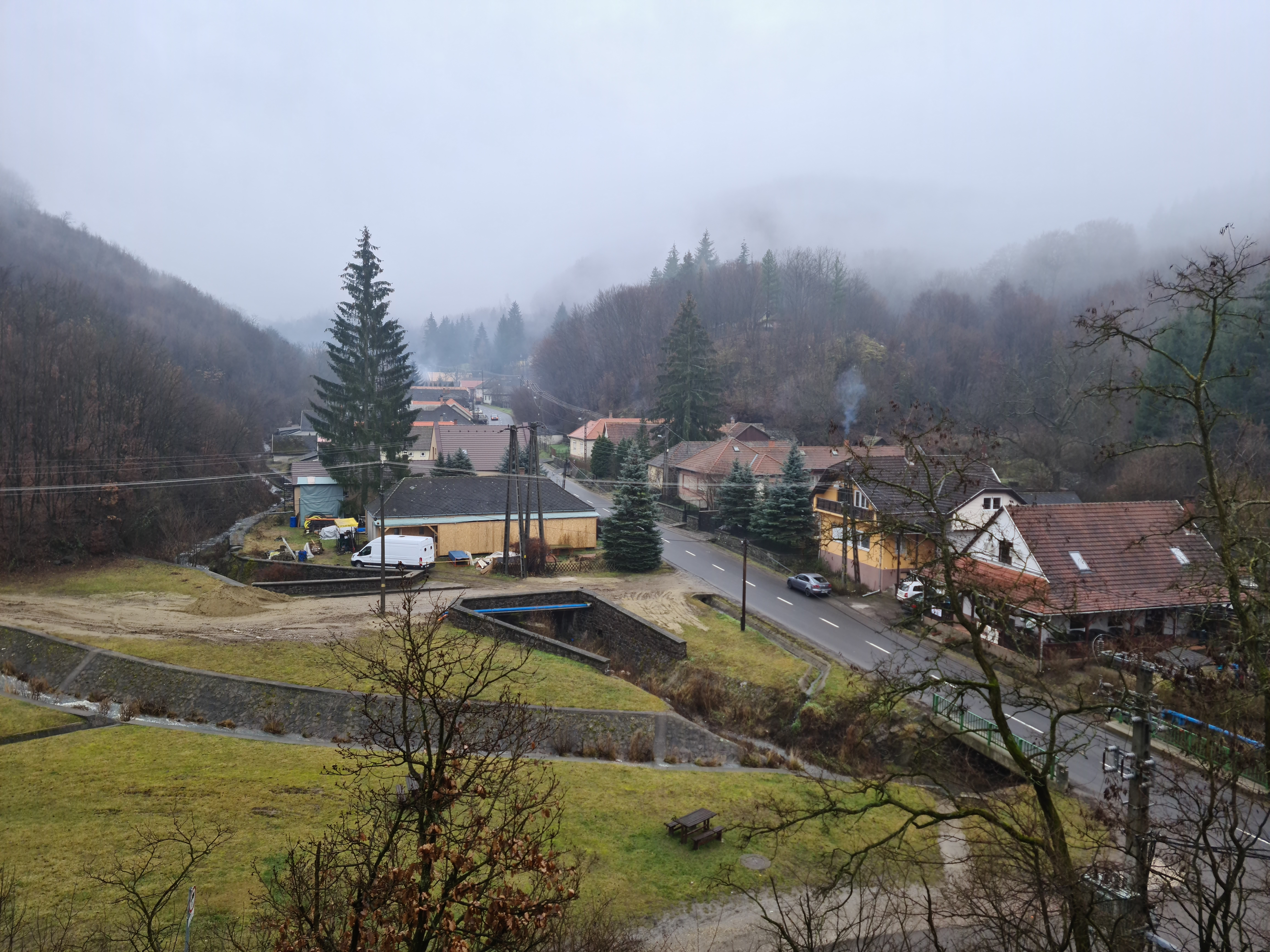
Mátrakeresztes

Pásztó is a town in Nógrád County, Hungary, beside of the Zagyva river and the Kövicses creek, between the Mátra and Cserhát mountain ranges. As of 2022 census, it has a population of 8,664 (see Demographics). The town is located beside of the (Nr. 81) Hatvan–Fiľakovo railway line and the main road 21 and 28.9 km from the M3 motorway. The settlement has its own railway station with public transport. Another railway stop is at the north end of the town named Mátraszőlős-Hasznos, and is the common railway stop of Mátraszőlős and the northeast part of the town (Hasznos).

== History ==
The settlement was first mentioned in 1190, when King Béla III founded a Cistercian monastery. Anonymus mentions the previous population of the settlement, when it was called Poztuh. After the Tatar destruction, the monastery was rebuilt by the monks. King Stephen V donated the monastery to István Rátóti, master horseman in 1265. His descendants, the Tari and Pásztó families, became the later owners. King Andrew III granted Pásztó the right to hold a fair in 1298. Agriculture is dominated by viticulture, the memories of which can still be seen today in the form of medieval wine cellars. King Sigismund granted the residents of Pásztó market town privileges in 1407, a statue was erected in memory of the king in 1987, and his face is part of the coat of arms of Pásztó. The settlement's school was built in 1438 and the Pásztó convent functioned as an authentication place. The town was destroyed by the Ottomans in 1552. Today's Baroque-style monastery was built in 1715 by the returning Cistercians with the support of King Leopold I. The 13th-century Romanesque St. Lawrence Church was expanded in the 15th century in Gothic style, and then rebuilt in Baroque style in the 18th century. The southern chapel of the church, on the other hand, remained in the Gothic style. The priory was built in Baroque style too, but the order abolished in 1787 by King Joseph II. In 1802 they got their rights back. The construction of the railway in 1867 did not increase the importance of the local industry. With the abolition of the privileges of the market town in 1871, it received the status of a "large village". Due to the phylloxera epidemic, grapes, which are the main source of income, suffer significant damage. In the 20th century the population of the settlement worked mostly in light industry and viticulture. The Pásztó hospital is built at the beginning of the 20th century. Around 1929 had a Jewish population of 120 families, they were deported in 1944. It was annexed to Nógrád county in 1950 and a spa was created to utilize the Mátraszőlős thermal water, which is still in operation today. The construction of housing estates begins in the 1960s. It received town status in 1984, when Hasznos and Mátraszőlős were added to it. Later in 1991 Mátraszőlős separated again as an independent village. The ruins of the Cistercian monastery and glass huta, the baroque monastery building with the memorial room of musicologist Benjamin Rajeczky can be seen in the neighborhood of the St. Lawrence church. The schoolmaster's house, built of stream stones, originally also functioned as the school building, and a grain storage with medieval tools was discovered underneath. Pásztó is still the cultural and economic center of the district.
Hasznos, the northeastern part of Pásztó, used to be an independent settlement, whose first mentioned as Hoznus in 1265, and the castle mentioned in 1329 under the name Castellanus de Hasznos. In the valley of the Kövecses creek, there was another castle called Óvár, which was already a ruin in the 15th century. The church of St. Mary Magdalene built in Gothic style and rebuilt in 1740 baroque style. Hasznos have an own postal code (3065).
Mátrakeresztes is located southeast of the city at the upper end of the Kövecses creek, its first owners were the Dessewffy family. The population of the settlement made a living by making glass and wooden spoons, first it was called Desewffy-huta, then Hasznosi Alsóhuta. It received its current name in 1937. The former castle of the Szohner family operates as a hotel. In 2005, the settlement was partially destroyed by a flood, after which the present Assumption of Mary church of the settlement was built in 2007. Mátrakeresztes have an own postal code (3082).

== Demographics ==
According the 2022 census, 92.4% of the population were of Hungarian ethnicity, 2.9% were Gypsies, 0.5% German and 7.4% were did not wish to answer. The religious distribution was as follows: 44.4% Roman Catholic, 1.7% Lutheran, 1.5% Calvinist, 0.5% Greek Catholic 10.1% non-denominational, and 38.5% did not wish to answer. The Gypsies have a local nationality government. The Statistical Office do not show data about the population of the other inner areas: Hasznos, Muzsla and Mátrakeresztes, which are 3, 4 and 10 km far from the town, despite they are inhabited. Another 16 people live in 3 farms.

Population by years:

Year	1870	1880	1890	1900	1910	1920	1930	1941
Population	5451	5766	6294	6664	7410	7544	8004	8499
Year	1949	1960	1970	1980	1990	2001	2011	2022
Population	8359	9977	9828	10522	10460	10319	9790	8664

== Politics ==
Mayors since 1990:

- 1990–1998: István Dobrovóczky (independent)
- 1998–2014: Imre János Sisák (firstly independent until 2002, then supported by the Fidesz and the MDF: 2002-2010, together with the MKDSZ: 2002-2006, with the KDNP and with the National Circle: 2006-2010, finally independent again from 2010)
- 2014–2018: Gábor Dömsödi (independent)
- 2018–2026: Attila Farkas (Fidesz–KDNP)
- 2026–: Gábor Dömsödi (independent)

== Notable people ==
- Pál Tittel (1784–1831) priest, astronomer, member of the Hungarian Academy of Sciences
- Dezső Vértesy (1881–1917) classical philologist
- Benjamin Rajeczky (1901–1989), music historian, the last prior in Pásztó
- Martin Himler (1888–1961), colonel of the Office of Strategic Services
- Antal Vágó (1891–1944), footballer, Olympic participant
- Kálmán Csohány (1925–1980), graphic artist
- Tibor Rubin (1929–2015), corporal of the 8th Cavalry Regiment
- István Gaál (1933–2007), film director, educated in Pásztó
- László Gazdag (1953–), economist
- István Kozma (1964–), footballer, FA Cup winner

== Twin towns – sister cities ==
Pásztó is twinned with:

- Ruffec, France
