= Martin Himler House =

Historic house in Kentucky, United States

- U.S. National Register of Historic Places
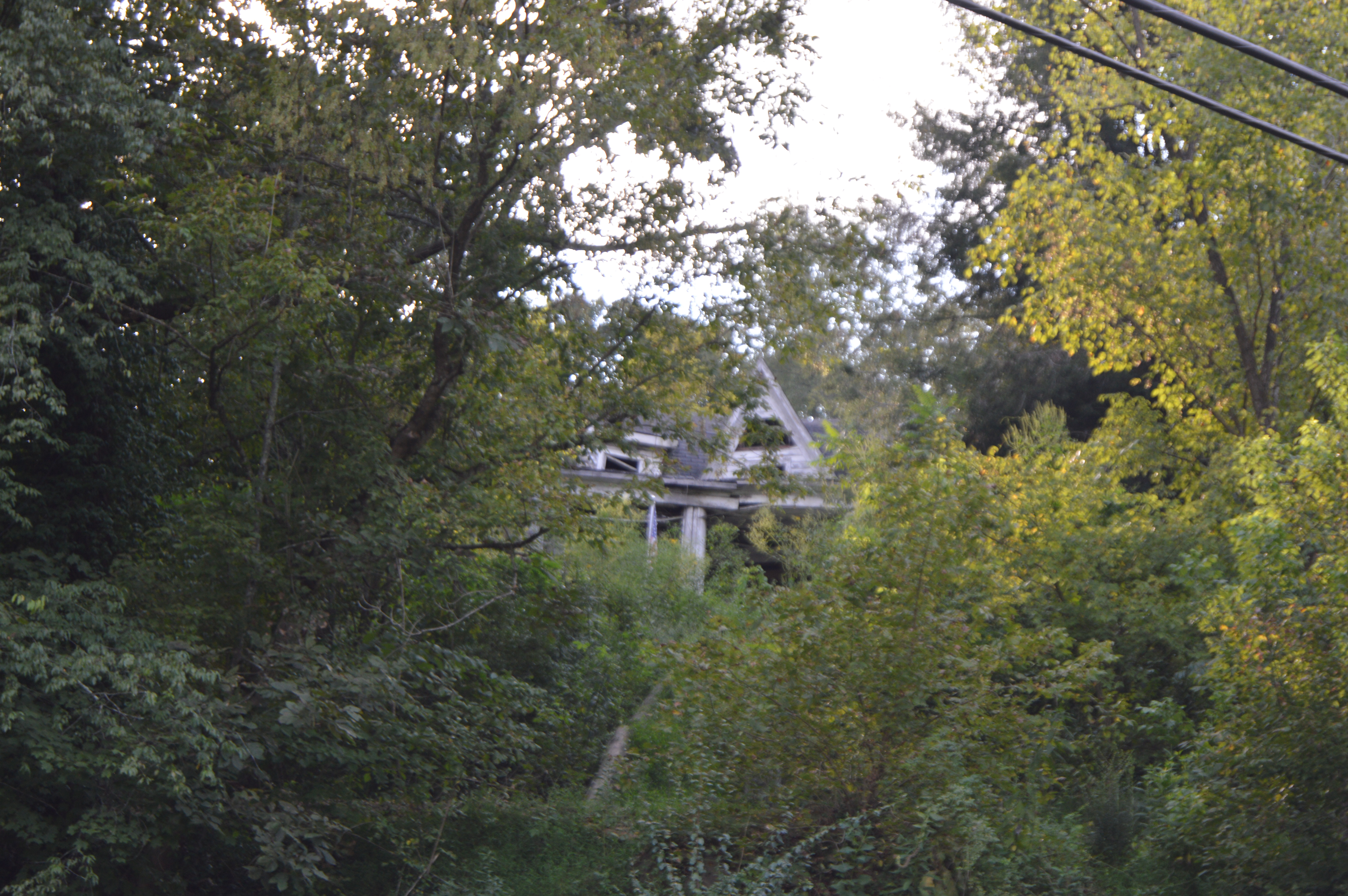
- Location: West of junction of KY 40 and KY 2031, Beauty, Kentucky
- Coordinates: 37°50′24″N 82°26′22″W
- Area: less than one acre
- Built: 1922
- Architectural style: Bungalow/craftsman, Dutch Colonial Revival
- NRHP reference No.: 91001667
- Added to NRHP: November 21, 1991

The Martin Himler House in Beauty in Martin County, Kentucky was listed on the National Register of Historic Places in 1991.

It was home of Martin Himler, who founded the Himler Coal Company.

It is a two-story wood-frame and weatherboarded house on a brick foundation. It sits upon a hill overlooking Beauty, which formerly was known as Himlerville.

== See also ==
- Himlerville, Kentucky
- National Register of Historic Places listings in Martin County, Kentucky
