= Laura, Kentucky =

Unincorporated community in Kentucky, United States

Laura is an unincorporated community in Martin County, Kentucky, United States. It is located at 37°43′33″N 82°26′35″W (37.7259317, -82.4429252) at an elevation of 676 feet (206 m). The zip code is 41250.
