= Martin County Courthouse (Kentucky) =

- U.S. National Register of Historic Places
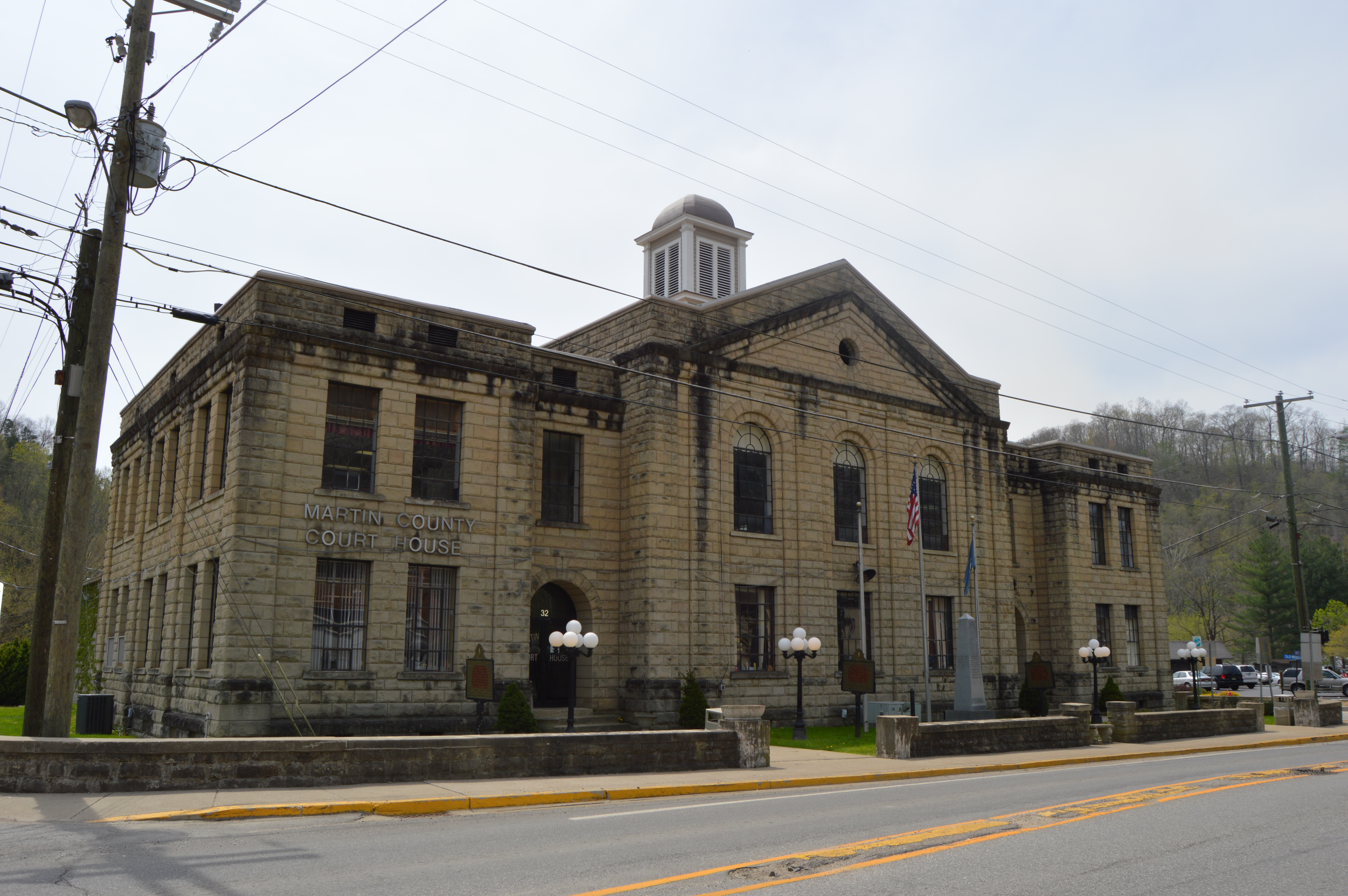
- Location: 10 Courthouse St., Inez, Kentucky
- Coordinates: 37°51′58″N 82°32′21″W
- Area: 1 acre (0.40 ha)
- Built: 1938-41
- Architect: Paul J. Arnett
- Architectural style: Late 19th and Early 20th Century American Movements
- NRHP reference No.: 06000811
- Added to NRHP: September 15, 2006

The Martin County Courthouse in Inez in Martin County, Kentucky was listed on the National Register of Historic Places in 2006.

It is the fourth courthouse built in Inez; it was built during 1938–41.
