= Pilgrim, Kentucky =

Unincorporated community in Kentucky, United States

- Unincorporated community
- Location within Kentucky Location within the United States
- Coordinates: 37°47′57″N 82°25′17″W
- Country: United States
- State: Kentucky
- County: Martin
- Elevation: 636 ft (194 m)
- Time zone: UTC-5 (Eastern (EST))
  - Summer (DST): UTC-4 (EDT)
- ZIP codes: 41250
- GNIS feature ID: 508820

Pilgrim is an unincorporated community located in Martin County, Kentucky, United States.
