= Job, Kentucky =

Unincorporated community in Kentucky, United States

- Unincorporated community
- Location within Kentucky Location within the United States
- Coordinates: 37°55′4″N 82°32′38″W
- Country: United States
- State: Kentucky
- County: Martin
- Elevation: 778 ft (237 m)
- Time zone: UTC-5 (Eastern (EST))
  - Summer (DST): UTC-4 (EDT)
- ZIP codes: 41224
- Area code: 606
- GNIS feature ID: 508347

Job is an unincorporated community located in Martin County, Kentucky, United States.
