= Katherine G. Langley =

American politician (1888–1948)

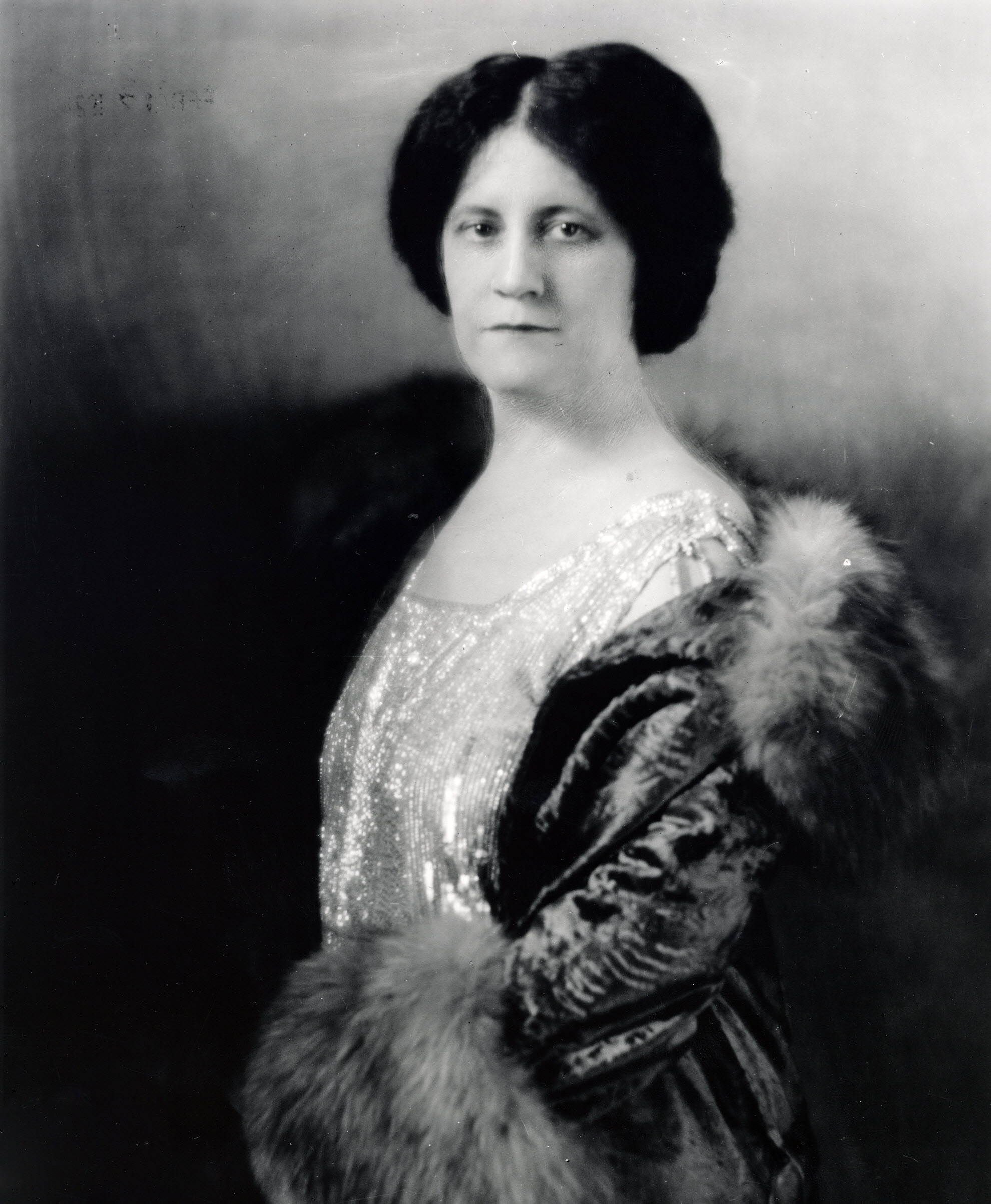
- Langley, c. 1927-31

Member of the U.S. House of Representatives from Kentucky's 10th district
- In office March 4, 1927 – March 4, 1931
- Preceded by: Andrew J. Kirk
- Succeeded by: Andrew J. May

Personal details
- Born: Katherine Emeline Gudger; February 14, 1888 Madison County, North Carolina, U.S.
- Died: August 15, 1948 (aged 60) Pikeville, Kentucky, U.S.
- Party: Republican
- Spouse: John W. Langley (m. 1905; died 1932)
- Children: 3
- Parent: James M. Gudger Jr. (father)
- Education: Emerson College of Oratory

Katherine Emeline Langley (née Gudger; February 14, 1888 – August 15, 1948) was an American politician. Langley was a member of United States House of Representatives from Kentucky during the Seventieth and Seventy-first sessions of Congress. She was the wife of Kentucky politician John W. Langley and daughter of James M. Gudger, Jr., a four-term Congressman from North Carolina. She was the first woman elected to Congress from Kentucky.

== Family life and education ==
Langley was born near Marshall in Madison County, North Carolina on February 14, 1888, to James Madison Gudger and Katherine Hawkins. She graduated in 1901 from the Woman's College, Richmond, Virginia and attended Emerson College of Oratory.

== Political career ==
Langley taught at the Virginia Institute at Bristol, Tennessee and worked as a secretary for her father before marrying John Langley and moving to Pikeville, Kentucky in 1905. She had three children: Katherine Langley Bentley, John Jr., and Susanna.

Katherine Langley served as chairman of the Pike County Red Cross Society during the First World War. Moving to Washington D.C. in 1907, she served as secretary for her husband for the eighteen years he served as the Republican representative for the 10th District. She held numerous appointed and elected public positions including vice chairman of the Republican State Central Committee of Kentucky 1920–1922—she was the first woman member of that committee and founded the Kentucky Woman's Republican State Committee which she chaired in 1920. She served as an alternate delegate to the Republican National Convention in 1920 and delegate in 1924. She clerked for the Committee on Public Buildings and Grounds which her husband chaired. John Langley was convicted of violating the Volstead Act by selling alcohol illegally and trying to bribe a federal officer. After his appeal was denied by the U.S. Supreme Court, in 1926 he resigned from his office in Congress as Kentucky's representative for the 10th District. Katherine Langley ran on the Republican ticket using her husband's arrest as part of a government conspiracy, and she soundly defeated her husband's successor, Andrew J. Kirk, in the primary.

Langley was elected by a healthy majority of votes twice to the United States House of Representatives as a representative from Kentucky during the Seventieth and Seventy-first sessions of Congress, serving from March 4, 1927, through March 3, 1931. Because of her husband's conviction and disgraceful resignation, she was marginalized in social circles that once had accommodated her flamboyant style: a reporter wrote of "her unstinted display of gypsy colors on the floor." Her physical presence became the target of derision by the Washington elite, and her Kentucky-style oratory was also attacked. During her tenure as a Representative, she missed a third (52 out of 174) of the roll-call votes. Her committee appointments were Claims, Invalid Pensions, and Immigration and Naturalization as well as the Committee on Education. While in Congress she supported women's issues and advocated for the creation of a cabinet-level department of education. In 1930 Katherine Langley was the first woman to serve on the Republican Committee on Committees in the U.S. House of Representatives.

Once her husband announced he would try to run for office again, her support among her constituents withered. There are no records that show they ran against each other in the primaries, but the connection that had once propelled her into office was gone. With the rise of the Democrats in Kentucky due to President Hoover's inability to turn around the agricultural depression or impact the depressed coal industry, Katherine Langley narrowly lost her bid for re-election in 1930 to the Democratic contender, Andrew Jackson May.

Later she served as a postmistress and was elected as a district railroad commissioner two times, serving the Third Kentucky District from 1939 to 1942. She was a member of the Daughters of the American Revolution.

== Death ==
Langley died in Pikeville, Kentucky, on August 15, 1948, and is buried in the Johnson Memorial Cemetery, Pikeville, Kentucky.

== See also ==
- Women in the United States House of Representatives
- John W. Langley

== Bibliography ==
- Foerstel, Karen (1999). "Katherine Langley (R-Ky.)". Biographical Dictionary of Congressional Women. Westport, CT: Greenwood Publishing Group. pp. 155–156. ISBN 978-0-313-30290-9.
- "Women in Congress, 1917–2006" (PDF). Office of History and Preservation, Office of the Clerk, U.S. House of Representatives. Washington, D.C.: Prepared Under the Direction of The Committee on House Administration of the U.S. House of Representatives (House document 108-223). 2006. pp. 76–79.
- "Langley, Katherine Gudger, 1888–1948 (Portraits)". CONTENTdm Collection. University of Louisville Libraries. Archived from the original on June 24, 2016.

U.S. House of Representatives
Preceded by Andrew J. Kirk	Member of the U.S. House of Representatives from Kentucky's 10th congressional district 1927 – 1931 (obsolete district)	Succeeded by Andrew J. May
