= John W. Langley =

American politician (1868–1932)

John Langley
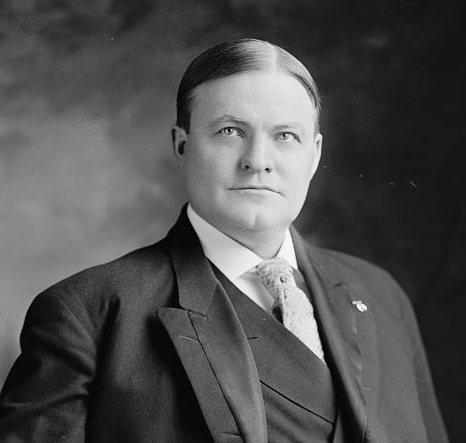
- Langley, 1905–1932

Member of the U.S. House of Representatives from Kentucky's 10th district
- In office March 4, 1907 – January 11, 1926
- Preceded by: Francis A. Hopkins
- Succeeded by: Andrew Jackson Kirk

Member of the Kentucky House of Representatives from Floyd and Johnson Counties
- In office August 1, 1887 – August 3, 1891
- Preceded by: J. W. Mayo
- Succeeded by: Constituency abolished

Personal details
- Born: John Wesley Langley; January 14, 1868 Floyd County, Kentucky, U.S.
- Died: January 17, 1932 (aged 64) Pikeville, Kentucky, U.S.
- Party: Republican
- Spouse: Katherine Gudger (m. 1905)
- Children: 3
- Education: National University; Georgetown University; George Washington University

John Wesley Langley (January 14, 1868 – January 17, 1932) was an American attorney and politician who served as a U.S. representative from Kentucky's 10th congressional district from 1907 until his resignation in 1926 following his conviction for illegally selling alcohol and bribery.

His wife, Katherine Gudger Langley, was subsequently elected twice to his former seat.

== Early life and career ==
Born in Floyd County, Kentucky, Langley attended the common schools and then taught school for three years. He attended the law department of the National, Georgetown, and Columbian (now George Washington) Universities in Washington, D.C., for an aggregate period of eight years.

He was Examiner in the Pension Office and a member of the Board of Pension Appeals, Law Clerk in the General Land Office, and from 1899 to 1907, he was Disbursing and Appointment Clerk of the Census Office. He served in the State House of Representatives from 1886 to 1890.

== Congressional career ==
Langley was elected on March 4, 1907, as a Republican to the Sixtieth and to the nine succeeding Congresses where he became known as "Pork Barrel John." He served as chairman of the Committee on Public Buildings and Grounds (Sixty-sixth through Sixty-eighth Congresses).

He resigned on January 11, 1926, after being convicted of illegally selling alcohol. Langley had deposited $115,000 in his bank account over a three-year period despite earning only $7,500 a year as a congressman. He had arranged for "medicinal" alcohol to be released to New York–based bootleggers during prohibition. He also tried to bribe a Prohibition officer. For these crimes, Langley was sentenced to two years in prison.

His wife Katherine, then ran for his seat and won in the next election, declaring that her husband had been the victim of a conspiracy and resolving to clear his name. She also won the next election. He was paroled from the Atlanta Penitentiary in 1929, and with Katherine's intervention, President Calvin Coolidge granted John Langley a pardon on December 20, 1928. He sent out a Christmas message to his wife's constituents and a week later declared his intention to run for office (even though the President had stipulated his clemency was predicated on never running for office again). He self-published a book They Tried to Crucify Me (1929) hoping to gain back his political clout.

== Later life and death ==
He resumed the practice of law in Pikeville, Kentucky, where he remained in good favor with his former constituents. Polly V. Hall, a Republican who was 98 years old in 1987 when she was interviewed, could remember his name (though not his wife's), and she stated emphatically that "... he was a good man ... never heard nothing bad said about him."

John Langley died on January 17, 1932, from pneumonia. He was interred in Floyd County, Kentucky.

== See also ==
- List of American federal politicians convicted of crimes
- List of federal political scandals in the United States

== Bibliography ==
- United States Congress. "John W. Langley (id: L000072)". Biographical Directory of the United States Congress.
- "John W. Langley With Others on Courthouse Steps (photo)". Getty Images. March 17, 2016.
- Langley, John Wesley (1929). They tried to crucify me: or, The smoke-screen of the Cumberlands. Pikeville, KY: John Wesley Langley. OCLC 714917435.

U.S. House of Representatives
| Preceded by Francis A. Hopkins | Member of the U.S. House of Representatives from Kentucky's 10th congressional district 1907–1926 | Succeeded by Andrew J. Kirk |
| Preceded by Frank Clark | Chair of the House Public Buildings Committee; 1919–1925 | Succeeded by Richard N. Elliott |
