= Southwest Tennessee Development District =

- Type: Non-Profit
- Founded: 1971
- Headquarters: Jackson, Tennessee
- Area served: Chester County; Decatur County; Hardeman County; Hardin County; Haywood County; Henderson County; Madison County; McNairy County
- Key people: Joe W. Barker (Director); Jessica Rice (Aging Director)
- Services: Economic and Community Development, Regional Development, Aging and Disability Programs, College Access and Mentoring Programs
- Number of employees: 31 employees
- Website: http://www.swtdd.org

Southwest Tennessee Development District, SWTDD is a planning organization, the Southwest Tennessee Development District promotes the renewal and revitalization of both rural and urban communities through betterment of an economic base (Economic Development), physical infrastructure (Community Development) and quality of life (Area Agency on Aging & Disability) for an eight county area. SWTDD serves the following counties in Tennessee: Chester County, Decatur County, Hardeman County, Hardin County, Haywood County, Henderson County, Madison County and McNairy County.

Southwest Tennessee Development District also serves twelve counties through a regional economic development initiative called REDI. Chester County, Crockett County, Decatur County, Fayette County, Gibson County, Hardeman County, Hardin County, Haywood County, Henderson County, Lauderdale County, McNairy County, and Tipton County. The SWTDD office is located in Jackson, Tennessee.

== History ==
The Southwest Tennessee Development District (SWTDD) was organized in 1971, and is one of nine state-wide districts established by the General Assembly under the Tennessee Development District Act of 1965. The SWTDD is charged with providing comprehensive planning, and promoting economic, community, and human resource development. As a public non-profit association of local governments, the District serves Chester, Decatur, Hardeman, Hardin, Haywood, Henderson, McNairy and Madison counties.

== SWTDD Today ==
SWTDD is governed by a board of directors that includes all county executives and mayors, one state representative, one state senator, industrial representatives and minority representatives from within the district. An executive director manages the operation of programs and staff. SWTDD staff has technical expertise in district management, economic and community development, housing, tourism, environmental planning, infrastructure development, senior citizen services planning, and public guardianship for the elderly.
