= Martin County School System =

School district in Kentucky, United States

Coordinates: 37°51′58″N 82°32′14″W

Martin County Schools

Location
- Inez, Kentucky United States

District information
- Type: Public
- Grades: Pre-K through 12
- Superintendent: Larry James

Students and staff
- Students: 2,155 (2008)
- Teachers: 179 (2008)
- Student–teacher ratio: 14.6 (2008)

Other information
- Website: martin.kyschools.us

The Martin County School System is a school district located in Martin County, Kentucky, United States. The superintendent is Larry James. The district headquarters are in Inez.

The school district serves all of Martin County.

== Schools ==
=== Secondary schools ===
- Martin County High School opened during the 2019–2020 school year. The current principal is Michelle Harless, and the assistant principal is Jason James.
- Martin County Middle School is located in the former Warfield Middle School building. The school originally opened as Warfield Middle School in 1997 and became Martin County Middle School in 2013. The facility currently serves seventh and eighth grade students. The current principal is Brent Haney. (Warfield)

=== Elementary schools ===
- Eden Elementary School is a public primary school located in an unincorporated area near Inez. It was founded after Tomahawk Elementary School/West Eden Elementary School and Grassy Elementary School/East Eden Elementary School closed in 2001 and 2002, respectively. The principal of the school is Shane Stafford. The school was named Eden after the former name of Inez.
- Inez Elementary School opened in 1934. A new building opened in 1984, and additions were built from 2007 to 2010. The current principal is Amanda Branham Fields. (unincorporated area)
- Warfield Elementary School opened in 1934. A new building opened in 1986, and additions were built from 2007 to 2010. The current principal is Jessica Jewell. (unincorporated area)
  - The school is located on a campus built sometime in the 1980s. It is on Route 292, north of the Warfield city limits. As of 1997, the school had about 340 students, 28 certified employees, and 29 other employees.

=== Former schools ===
==== High schools and middle schools ====
- Inez High School opened in 1934. Before 1934, the school was known as Martin County High School. The Inez High School and Elementary School facility housed both high school students in grades 9 through 12 and grade-school students through grade 8. Inez High School closed in 1972 when the county consolidated its high school students at the newly opened Sheldon Clark High School. The grade-school students remained at the former Inez High School and Elementary School facility.
- Warfield High School opened in 1934. The Warfield High School and Elementary School facility housed both high school students in grades 9 through 12 and grade-school students through grade 8. Warfield High School closed in 1972 when its high school students were consolidated with those from Inez at Sheldon Clark High School. The grade-school students remained at the former Warfield High School and Elementary School facility.
- Sheldon Clark High School opened in 1972 following the consolidation of Inez High School and Warfield High School. It closed in 2019 after the opening of the new Martin County High School facility.
- Inez Middle School was established in 1978 when grades 6 through 8 at Inez were reorganized as middle-school grades. Students in grades K through 5 continued as Inez Elementary School at the same school site, so the establishment of Inez Middle School did not initially involve a move to a separate building. A new Inez Elementary School building opened in 1984, and the elementary students moved to the new facility, leaving the former Inez High School and Elementary School building to serve the middle-school students. Inez Middle School remained there until a new middle-school building opened in January 1993. Inez Middle School closed in 2013. As of 2020, the 1993 building houses White Oak Hill, which is part of Addiction Recovery Care (ARC). (unincorporated area)
- Warfield Middle School was established in 1978 when grades 6 through 8 at Warfield were reorganized as middle-school grades. Students in grades K through 5 continued as Warfield Elementary School at the same school site, so the establishment of Warfield Middle School did not initially involve a move to a separate building. A new Warfield Elementary School building opened in 1986, and the elementary students moved to the new facility, leaving the former Warfield High School and Elementary School building to serve the middle-school students. A new Warfield Middle School building opened in 1997. Warfield Middle School closed in 2013, and the 1997 building became Martin County Middle School. (Warfield)

==== Elementary schools ====
- East Eden Elementary School opened in 2001 and closed in 2002. It was located in the former Grassy Elementary School building. The school was formed after Grassy Elementary School was officially closed in June 2001. Plans called for students to move to Eden Elementary in January 2002; however, the move did not occur until August 2002.
- Grassy Elementary School opened in 1960 and closed in 2001 due to consolidation with Tomahawk Elementary School to form Eden Elementary. The board officially closed the facility in June 2001.
- Pigeon Roost Elementary School opened in 1960 and closed in 2004 due to flooding. Students were moved to Warfield Elementary School.
- Tomahawk Elementary School opened in 1940 and closed in 2001 due to consolidation with Grassy Elementary School to form Eden Elementary.
- Turkey Elementary School opened in 1960 and closed in 1997. Students were moved to either Inez Elementary School or Warfield Elementary School.
- Venters Branch Elementary School opened in 1960 and closed in 1993. It was the smallest of the four schools built in 1960, with only four classrooms. Students were moved to Inez Elementary School.
- West Eden Elementary School opened in 2001 and closed in 2002. It was located in the former Tomahawk Elementary School building. The school was formed after Tomahawk Elementary School was officially closed in June 2001. Plans called for students to move to Eden Elementary in January 2002; however, the move did not occur until August 2002.

==== Alternative Schools ====
- Martin County Alternative School opened in 1992 in the former Inez High School building. In 1993, students were moved to the Venters Branch building. The school served students in grades 6 through 12 and used the Explorers as its mascot. The facility had four teachers and one principal. In 1997, a small fire caused the Venters Branch facility to be vacated. The school was then closed and reorganized under the name Martin County Alternative Placement Center.
- Martin County Alternative Placement Center opened in 1997 and closed in 2019. It served students in grades 8 through 12. The facility opened after Martin County Alternative School closed. It was originally located behind Sheldon Clark High School. During the 2013–2014 school year, the facility moved behind the interim Sheldon Clark High School facility at Inez Middle School. It shared administration with Sheldon Clark High School. The facility had two teachers and one instructional aide.

== Martin County Area Technology Center ==
Martin County Area Technology Center opened in 1967 and is operated by Kentucky Tech. The original building was the first facility constructed as part of the plan that later included Sheldon Clark High School. The vocational school was originally affiliated with Mayo State Vocational School.

Over the years, the center has had several names, including Martin County Vocational School and Martin County Area Vocational Education Center. In addition to its current programs, students previously could take drafting and mining classes, though those programs were eventually phased out.

The mission of Martin County Area Technology Center continues to focus on preparing students for careers and entry into the workforce. The current principal is Chad Williams. The school offers programs in vocational trades, nursing, information technology, carpentry, electricity, and office technology.

The new Martin County Area Technology Center building opened in 2020. It is located at the site of the current Martin County High School. The former Area Technology Center building, built in 1967, currently houses the Martin County Board of Education district offices.

== Police department ==
The Martin County Board of Education Police Department was activated in September 2025, with an allotted strength of three officers plus a chief of police. The current chief of police is Nathan Todd.
