= Mátraszőlős =

- Village
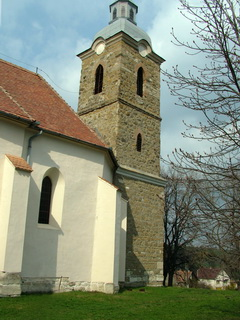
- Saint Elizabeth church

- Coat of arms

- Location in Hungary
- Coordinates: 47°57′34″N 19°41′20″E
- Country: Hungary
- County: Nógrád
- District: Pásztó
- First mentioned: 1229

Government
  - Mayor: Ádám Nagy (Ind.)

Area
  - Total: 29.17 km^{2} (11.26 sq mi)

Population (2022)
  - Total: 1,454
  - Density: 49.85/km^{2} (129.1/sq mi)
- Time zone: UTC+1 (CET)
  - Summer (DST): UTC+2 (CEST)
- Postal code: 3068
- Area code: 32
- Website: www.matraszolos.hu

Mátraszőlős is a village in Nógrád County, Hungary, under the Cserhát mountain ranges, beside of the Hévíz creek. As of 2022 census, it has a population of 1454 (see Demographics). The village located beside of the main road 21 and 3.0 km far from the (Nr. 81) Hatvan–Fiľakovo railway line and 32.7 km from the M3 motorway. The settlement has uts own railway stop with public transport under the name Mátraszőlős-Hasznos.

== History ==
Celtic graves were found near the settlement during road construction. The settlement is first mentioned in 1229 in the form Zeuleus, then it is used in the form Szőllős. A castle is mentioned in a document from 1241, but it was destroyed around 1290. The village church was built in the 13th century in the Romanesque style, which was rebuilt in the Gothic style in the 15th century and named after St. Elizabeth. The Ottomans used it as a granary. It was rebuilt in the Baroque style in the 1670s, and a tower was added in 1864. A chapel was built on the hillside in 1774, and a rococo-style statue of St. John of Nepomuk was created. The railway reached it in 1867, the railway stop already contained a reference to the Mátra mountain ranges. The settlement got its current name in 1906. In the 19th century, the honey stone mine was opened, to which a narrow-gauge industrial railway from Pásztó was built, which ceased to exist together with the mine a hundred years later. The rococo-style noble mansion of the Jankovich family was built in the 19th century, notable for its neo-Gothic living room, later a boarding house and then the office of the cooperative. The settlement's spa was closed in 1950, and the thermal water flows unusedly away beside of the village. The settlement was merged with Pásztó and Hasznos in 1984, thus becoming part of the town of Pásztó, but in 1991 it separated from the city and has since become an independent village again.

== Demographics ==
According the 2022 census, 90.8% of the population were of Hungarian ethnicity, 9.9% were Gypsies and 8.8% were did not wish to answer. The religious distribution was as follows: 39.7% Roman Catholic, 1.1% Calvinist, 0.6% Lutheran, 12.0% non-denominational, and 42.7% did not wish to answer. The Gypsies have a local nationality government. No population in farms.

Population by years:

Year	1870	1880	1890	1900	1910	1920	1930	1941
Population	773	908	969	1032	1120	1162	1423	1587
Year	1949	1960	1970	1980	1990	2001	2011	2022
Population	1613	1804	1927	1918	1808	1714	1596	1454

== Politics ==
Mayors since 1991:

- 1991–2002: Balázs Langmayer (independent)
- 2002–2019: Gyula Tóth (independent)
- 2019–: Ádám Nagy (independent)
