= Beauty, Kentucky =

Unincorporated community in Kentucky, United States

- Unincorporated community
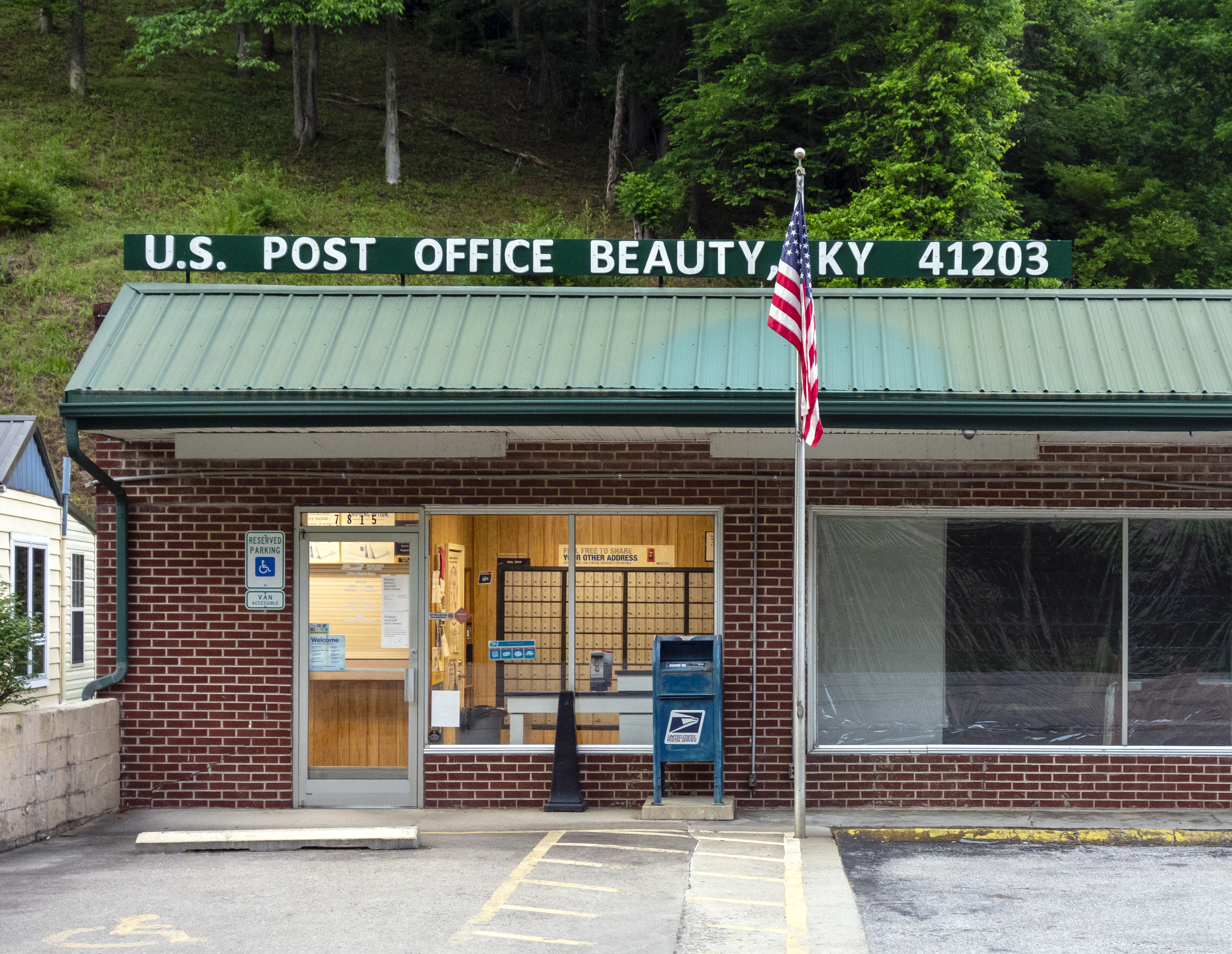
- Beauty post office

- Location within Kentucky Location within the United States
- Coordinates: 37°50′24″N 82°26′21″W
- Country: United States
- State: Kentucky
- County: Martin
- Elevation: 653 ft (199 m)
- Time zone: UTC-5 (Eastern (EST))
  - Summer (DST): UTC-5 (CDT)
- ZIP code: 41203
- Area code: 606
- GNIS feature ID: 486602

Beauty (formerly Himlerville) is an unincorporated community in Martin County, Kentucky, United States. During the early 1920s the community was the home of the Himler Coal Company, a cooperative mining venture conducted by a group of Hungarian immigrants.

== History ==
Hungarian-American newspaper editor Martin Himler was the organizer of the Himler Mining Company project.

=== Origins ===
In the mountains of Eastern Kentucky once existed the unique, Hungarian community of Himlerville. Martin Himler emigrated from Hungary to New York and, eventually, to Martin County and established the Himler Coal Company and soon after the town of Himlerville. He contacted other Hungarians to share in his dream of an all Hungarian community nestled deep in the Appalachian Mountains.

The Himler Coal Company as it appeared in its heyday in the early 1920s.

=== Development ===
Himlerville became a lively community of industrious Hungarian immigrants. More than 200 homes were built, as well as, many businesses to supply the coal mine and the town's residents. A railroad was constructed, along with a bridge over the Tug River to transport supplies, lumber and coal in and out of Himlerville. A bank was established, as well as schools, churches, and a town hall for community gatherings.

Himlerville had its own water reservoir, power station, which provided electricity for the community. The town also had its own newspaper, which was printed in both English and Hungarian. During the 1920s, Himlerville was a progressive town with many thriving businesses to accommodate its unique population.

As Coal Age described, "Stock in the company is sold only to Hungarians, native or naturalized. One of the bylaws of the company provides, however, that no stockholder may seek employment with the company until he has undertaken naturalization as an American Citizen. According to Martin Himler, president of the company, no stockholder in the company has yet arrived in America without a firm resolution to become an American citizen as promptly as the laws will permit."

=== Demise ===
In 1928, Himler Coal Company went bankrupt due to a devastating flood and Martin Himler left, leaving behind a mansion on the hill and his dream of an all-Hungarian community. Most of the residents soon followed, never to return. In 1929, the name of the town was changed to Beauty, and very little remains of this once exclusive Hungarian community in the mountains of Eastern Kentucky.

The Martin Himler House was listed on the National Register of Historic Places in 1991.

== Notable residents ==
Beauty was the childhood home of country singer Angaleena Presley.

== See also ==
- Ajax (formerly Himler), West Virginia
- Martin Himler House
