= Himler Coal Company =

American mining company

View of the Himler Coal Company's operation in Himlerville, Kentucky during the height of its activity in the 1920s.

The Himler Coal Company was a cooperative mining company established in 1918 by Hungarian-American immigrant Martin Himler. The company was responsible for the establishment of two company towns, Himler (now Ajax), West Virginia and Himlerville (now Beauty), Kentucky. Its finances exhausted, the company was wiped out by flooding in 1928.

Himler Coal Company is remembered for its unique organizational structure, believed to be the only coal mining company ever organized on a cooperative basis.

== History ==
=== Background ===
Hungarian-American newspaper editor Martin Himler, organizer of the Himler Mining Company project.

On May 7, 1907, the S.S. Carpathia arrived at New York City carrying among its passengers an impoverished 18-year old ethnic Jew from Hungary, Martin Himler. The youth obtained his first job working in the coal mines of Thacker, West Virginia, before taking a similar job as a miner in Iselin, Pennsylvania.
