= Martin County, Kentucky =

County in Kentucky, United States

- County
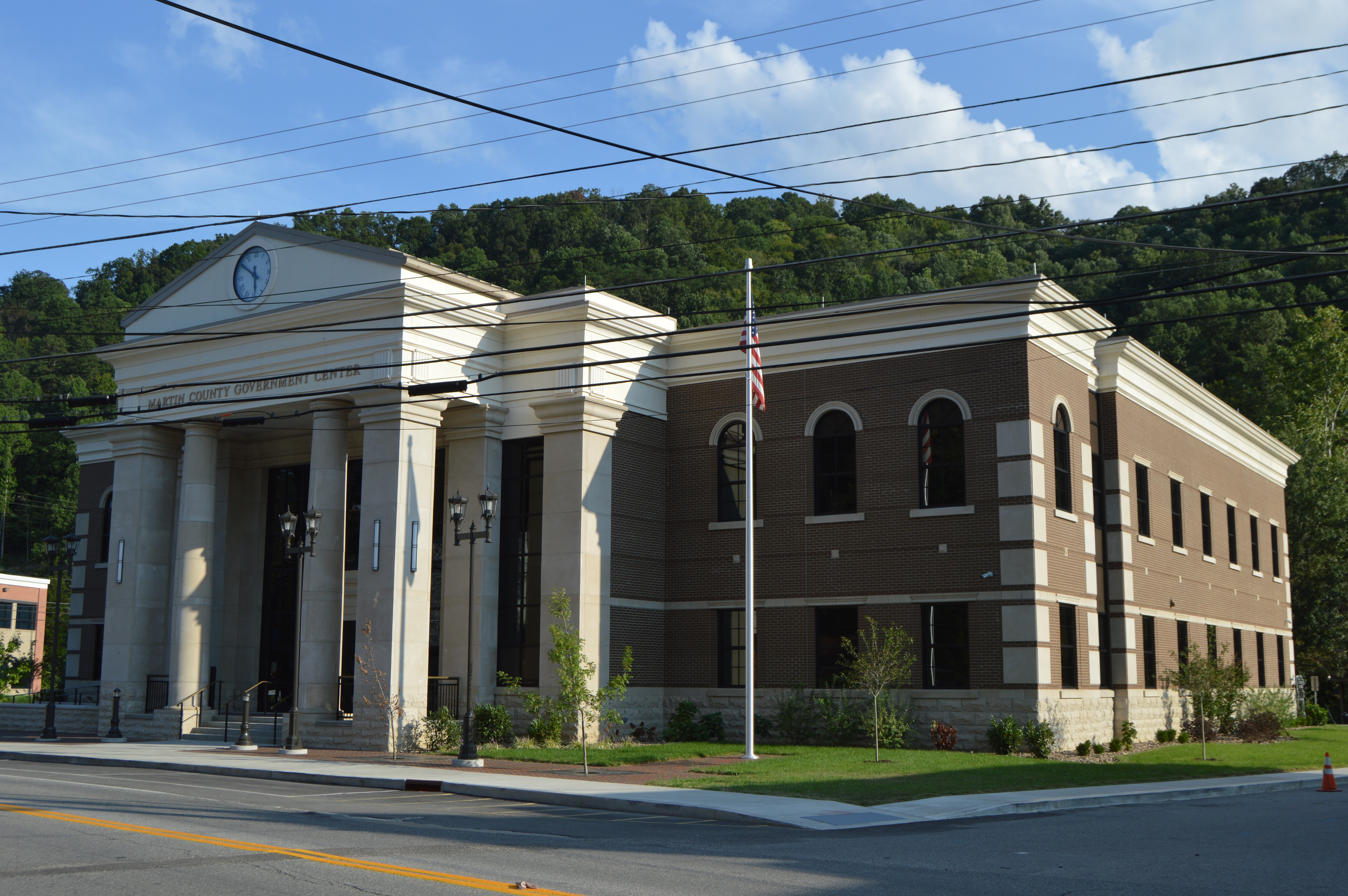
- County government center

- Location within the U.S. state of Kentucky
- Coordinates: 37°48′N 82°31′W
- Country: United States
- State: Kentucky
- Founded: September 1, 1870
- Named for: John P. Martin
- Seat: Inez
- Largest city: Inez

Government
  - Judge/Executive: Lon Lafferty (R)

Area
  - Total: 231 sq mi (600 km^{2})
  - Land: 230 sq mi (600 km^{2})
  - Water: 1.0 sq mi (2.6 km^{2}) 0.4%

Population (2020)
  - Total: 11,287
  - Estimate (2025): 10,697 ▼
  - Density: 49/sq mi (19/km^{2})
- Time zone: UTC−5 (Eastern)
  - Summer (DST): UTC−4 (EDT)
- Congressional district: 5th
- Website: www.martincountykentucky.com

Martin County is a county located in the U.S. state of Kentucky. As of the 2020 census, the population was 11,287. Its county seat is Inez. The county was founded in 1870 and is named for Congressman John Preston Martin.

== History ==
Martin County was formed in 1870, and named for congressman John Preston Martin. The county seat was initially located in Warfield, but was moved to Inez due to its more central location in the county.

The county has long been reliant on the coal industry. In 1964, President Lyndon Johnson visited Inez, where he announced the launch of the War on Poverty.

== Geography ==
According to the U.S. Census Bureau, the county has a total area of 231 square miles (600 km^{2}), of which 230 square miles (600 km^{2}) is land and 1.0 square mile (2.6 km^{2}) (0.4%) is water. The county's eastern border is formed by the Tug Fork of the Big Sandy River.

=== Adjacent counties ===
- Lawrence County (northwest)
- Wayne County, West Virginia (northeast)
- Mingo County, West Virginia (southeast)
- Pike County (south)
- Floyd County (southwest)
- Johnson County (west)

== Demographics ==
Historical population
Census	Pop.	Note	%±
1880	3,057		—
1890	4,209		37.7%
1900	5,780		37.3%
1910	7,291		26.1%
1920	7,654		5.0%
1930	8,584		12.2%
1940	10,970		27.8%
1950	11,677		6.4%
1960	10,201		−12.6%
1970	9,377		−8.1%
1980	13,925		48.5%
1990	12,526		−10.0%
2000	12,578		0.4%
2010	12,929		2.8%
2020	11,287		−12.7%
2025 (est.)	10,697	▼	−5.2%
U.S. Decennial Census; 1790-1960 1900-1990; 1990-2000 2010-2021

=== 2020 census ===
As of the 2020 census, the county had a population of 11,287. The median age was 40.3 years. 19.7% of residents were under the age of 18 and 16.7% of residents were 65 years of age or older. For every 100 females there were 125.6 males, and for every 100 females age 18 and over there were 128.7 males age 18 and over.

The racial makeup of the county was 90.9% White, 7.1% Black or African American, 0.4% American Indian and Alaska Native, 0.2% Asian, 0.0% Native Hawaiian and Pacific Islander, 0.0% from some other race, and 1.5% from two or more races. Hispanic or Latino residents of any race comprised 2.6% of the population.

0.0% of residents lived in urban areas, while 100.0% lived in rural areas.

There were 4,035 households in the county, of which 29.6% had children under the age of 18 living with them and 26.6% had a female householder with no spouse or partner present. About 28.5% of all households were made up of individuals and 13.3% had someone living alone who was 65 years of age or older.

There were 4,792 housing units, of which 15.8% were vacant. Among occupied housing units, 76.4% were owner-occupied and 23.6% were renter-occupied. The homeowner vacancy rate was 2.0% and the rental vacancy rate was 11.7%.

=== 2000 census ===
As of the census of 2000, there were 12,578 people, 4,776 households, and 3,620 families residing in the county. The population density was 54 per square mile (21/km^{2}). There were 5,551 housing units at an average density of 24 per square mile (9.3/km^{2}). The racial makeup of the county was 99.25% White, 0.03% Black or African American, 0.06% Native American, 0.07% Asian, 0.06% Pacific Islander, 0.01% from other races, and 0.52% from two or more races. 0.62% of the population were Hispanic or Latino of any race.

There were 4,776 households, out of which 39.20% had children under the age of 18 living with them, 59.50% were married couples living together, 12.50% had a female householder with no husband present, and 24.20% were non-families. 21.80% of all households were made up of individuals, and 8.30% had someone living alone who was 65 years of age or older. The average household size was 2.62 and the average family size was 3.05.

In the county, the population was spread out, with 28.10% under the age of 18; 9.50% from 18 to 24; 29.30% from 25 to 44; 23.30% from 45 to 64; and 9.70% who were 65 years of age or older. The median age was 34 years. For every 100 females there were 98.00 males. For every 100 females age 18 and over, there were 92.10 males.

The median income for a household in the county was $18,279, and the median income for a family was $21,574. Males had a median income of $31,994 versus $18,011 for females. The per capita income for the county was $10,650. About 33.30% of families and 37.00% of the population were below the poverty line, including 45.10% of those under age 18 and 26.90% of those age 65 or over.

== Politics ==
United States presidential election results for Martin County, Kentucky
Year	Republican		Democratic		Third party(ies)	
Year	No.	%	No.	%	No.	%
1912	655	54.18%	256	21.17%	298	24.65%
1916	1,100	78.40%	280	19.96%	23	1.64%
1920	1,726	83.10%	330	15.89%	21	1.01%
1924	1,512	72.94%	364	17.56%	197	9.50%
1928	1,674	80.44%	404	19.41%	3	0.14%
1932	1,774	69.32%	770	30.09%	15	0.59%
1936	2,037	71.35%	817	28.62%	1	0.04%
1940	2,275	73.34%	826	26.63%	1	0.03%
1944	2,067	78.33%	571	21.64%	1	0.04%
1948	1,964	67.24%	911	31.19%	46	1.57%
1952	2,641	69.23%	1,174	30.77%	0	0.00%
1956	2,927	80.57%	694	19.10%	12	0.33%
1960	2,809	71.57%	1,116	28.43%	0	0.00%
1964	1,567	47.40%	1,694	51.24%	45	1.36%
1968	1,943	68.42%	759	26.73%	138	4.86%
1972	2,495	77.87%	661	20.63%	48	1.50%
1976	2,120	62.12%	1,267	37.12%	26	0.76%
1980	2,793	63.05%	1,567	35.37%	70	1.58%
1984	3,238	68.03%	1,471	30.90%	51	1.07%
1988	2,587	61.65%	1,581	37.68%	28	0.67%
1992	1,961	47.89%	1,715	41.88%	419	10.23%
1996	1,612	41.92%	1,807	47.00%	426	11.08%
2000	2,667	59.85%	1,714	38.46%	75	1.68%
2004	2,996	66.01%	1,504	33.14%	39	0.86%
2008	2,824	76.49%	808	21.89%	60	1.63%
2012	3,180	83.16%	574	15.01%	70	1.83%
2016	3,503	88.62%	363	9.18%	87	2.20%
2020	3,496	88.82%	403	10.24%	37	0.94%
2024	3,343	91.39%	287	7.85%	28	0.77%

=== Elected officials ===
Elected officials as of January 3, 2025
U.S. House	Hal Rogers (R)	KY 5
Ky. Senate	Phillip Wheeler (R)	31
Ky. House	Bobby McCool (R)	97

== Economy ==
The Federal Bureau of Prisons U.S. Penitentiary, Big Sandy is located in unincorporated Martin County, near Inez.

They are 3 industrial parks located in Martin County. They are the Honey Branch Industrial Park, The Calloway Industrial Park and the John Callahan Industrial Park

- Honey Branch Industrial Park is an industrial park that is run by 4 different counties in the region. The major tenants are the Big Sandy Regional Airport. The Federal Bureau of Prisons U.S. Penitentiary, Big Sandy. Core Energy Corporation, Consolidated Pipe and Supply, Appleatcha Apple Orchard, CZAR Coal and Offices for Booth Energy and subsidies
- Calloway Industrial Park is pretty much abandoned. There was a Dirt Race Track and a Machine Shop. Mostly just houses and 1 water tank
- John B Callahan Industrial Park is home to C&S Vaults and the Martin County Board of Education Transportation Garage and Maintenance Department.

=== Coal companies in Martin County ===
- Alliance Resource Partners
- Excel Coal Corporation
- Booth Energy
- CZAR Energy

== Education ==
There is one school district in the county, Martin County School System.

It operates the following public schools.

- Martin County High School
- Martin County Area Technology Center
- Martin County Middle School
- Eden Elementary School
- Inez Elementary School
- Warfield Elementary School
- Martin County Head Start

There is one private Christian school located in Martin County

- Sure Foundations Christian Academy

== Communities ==
=== Cities ===
- Inez (county seat)
- Warfield

=== Unincorporated communities ===
- Beauty
- Job
- Lovely
- Laura
- Pilgrim
- Tomahawk

== See also ==
- Big Sandy Regional Airport
- Big Sandy Area Development District
- Dry counties
- Martin County coal slurry spill
- National Register of Historic Places listings in Martin County, Kentucky
- United States Penitentiary, Big Sandy
