= Inez, Kentucky =

- City
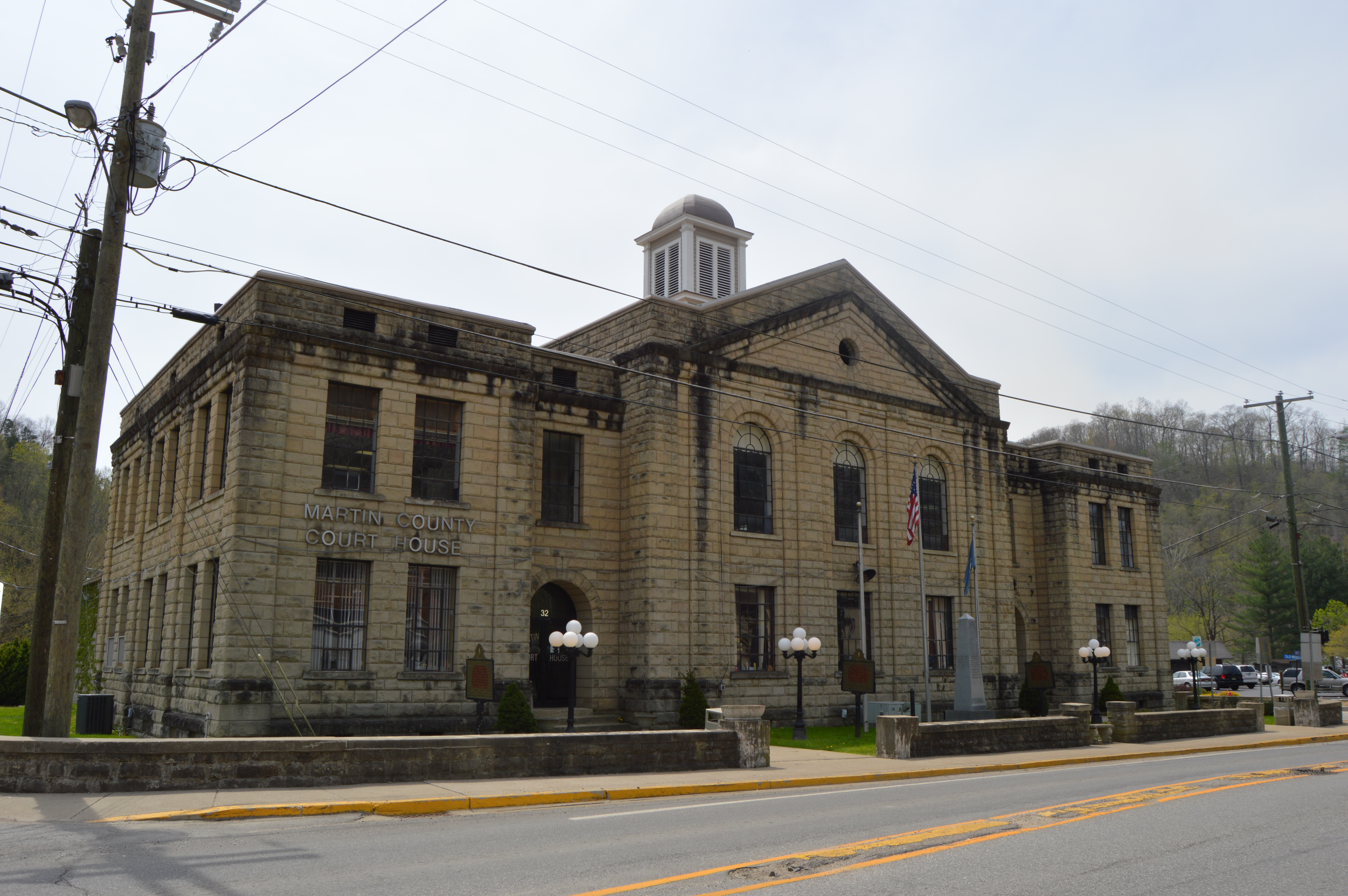
- Martin County courthouse in Inez

- Location of Inez in Martin County, Kentucky.
- Coordinates: 37°52′10″N 82°32′23″W
- Country: United States
- State: Kentucky
- County: Martin
- Incorporated: February 5, 1942
- Named for: The daughter of a local postmaster

Government
  - Type: City Commission
  - Mayor: Edward Daniels

Area
  - Total: 1.72 sq mi (4.46 km^{2})
  - Land: 1.72 sq mi (4.46 km^{2})
  - Water: 0 sq mi (0.00 km^{2})
- Elevation: 666 ft (203 m)

Population (2020)
  - Total: 546
  - Density: 317.0/sq mi (122.38/km^{2})
- Time zone: UTC-5 (Eastern (EST))
  - Summer (DST): UTC-4 (EDT)
- ZIP code: 41224
- Area code: 606
- FIPS code: 21-39430
- GNIS feature ID: 2404761
- Website: inez.ky.gov

Inez (/ˈaɪnəz/ EYE-nəz) is a home rule-class city in and the county seat of Martin County, Kentucky, United States. The population was 546 at the 2020 census.

== Geography ==
Inez is located at 37°51′59″N 82°32′21″W (37.866431, -82.539058). According to the United States Census Bureau, the city has an area of 0.7 square miles (1.8 km^{2}), all land.

== History ==
James Ward first settled the area about 1810; originally, it was named Arminta Ward's Bottom. J.M. Stepp renamed it Eden about the time it became the seat of government for Martin County in 1873. As there was already a post office named Eden, Kentucky, the local postmaster was obliged to rename the town on June 23, 1874. The name is usually held to have been derived from that of Inez Frank, daughter of the Louisa, Kentucky postmaster in neighboring Lawrence County.

=== Lincoln County Feud ===
The Lincoln County Feud occurred in Lincoln County, West Virginia, during the 1880s. In October 1889, Milt Haley and Green McCoy, two West Virginia fugitives, were captured and subsequently held at the Martin County Jail. A West Virginia posse captured Haley and McCoy and lynched them at Green Shoal near Harts, West Virginia. In March 1995, songwriter and musician John Hartford and historian/author Brandon Kirk visited Inez as part of their research on the feud.

=== Presidential visit ===
President Lyndon B. Johnson visited Inez in 1964, landing by helicopter with his party at an abandoned miniature golf course, to promote the War on Poverty. According to a 2014 NPR article, the poverty rate at the time was more than 60 percent.

== Economy ==
Inez is home to several industrial employers primarily focused on the area's robust energy market. A multitude of coal, gas and oil exploration and affiliated services companies operate in the mineral-rich areas in and around Martin County. Outside the city is another major regional employer, the Big Sandy facility of the Federal Bureau of Prisons.

== Demographics ==
Historical population
Census	Pop.	Note	%±
1880	108		—
1890	309		186.1%
1900	412		33.3%
1910	381		−7.5%
1950	622		—
1960	566		−9.0%
1980	413		—
1990	511		23.7%
2000	466		−8.8%
2010	717		53.9%
2020	546		−23.8%
U.S. Decennial Census

As of the census of 2000, there were 466 people, 212 households, and 132 families residing in the city. The population density was 710.5 inhabitants per square mile (274.3/km^{2}). There were 253 housing units at an average density of 385.7 per square mile (148.9/km^{2}). The racial makeup of the city was 98.28% White, and 1.72% from two or more races. Hispanic or Latino of any race were 0.64% of the population.

There were 212 households, of which 30.7% had children under age 18 living with them, 44.8% were married couples living together, 15.1% had a female householder with no husband present, and 37.7% were non-families. 35.4% of all households were made up of individuals, and 14.2% had someone living alone who was 65 or older. The average household size was 2.18 and the average family size was 2.83.

In the city, the population was spread out, with 24.0% under 18, 10.3% from 18 to 24, 29.4% from 25 to 44, 22.3% from 45 to 64, and 13.9% who were 65 or older. The median age was 36. For every 100 females, there were 75.2 males. For every 100 females 18 and over, there were 67.0 males.

The median income for a household in the city was $21,875, and the median income for a family was $25,938. Males had a median income of $41,875 versus $17,292 for females. The national median household income was $46,326 in 2006 while the median personal income (including only those above the age of 25) was $32,140. The city's per capita income was $14,183. About 37.0% of families and 35.3% of the population were below the poverty line, including 41.7% of those under 18 and 21.4% of those 65 or over.

== Government and infrastructure ==
The United States Postal Service operates the Inez Post Office.

The Federal Bureau of Prisons U.S. Penitentiary, Big Sandy is near Inez, in unincorporated Martin County.

== Education ==
The Martin County School System serves Inez. Sheldon Clark High School is the former area high school, replaced by Martin County High School. Eden Elementary, Warfield Elementary, and Inez Elementary serve grades K-6 and Martin County Middle School (MCMS) grades 7–8. MCMS is also in Warfield.

Inez has a lending library, a branch of the Martin County Public Library.

== Notable residents ==
- Mike Duncan, politician and former chairman of the Republican National Committee
- Josey Montana McCoy, actor
- Nimrod Workman, American folk singer, coal miner, and trade unionist
