= List of birds of Canada =

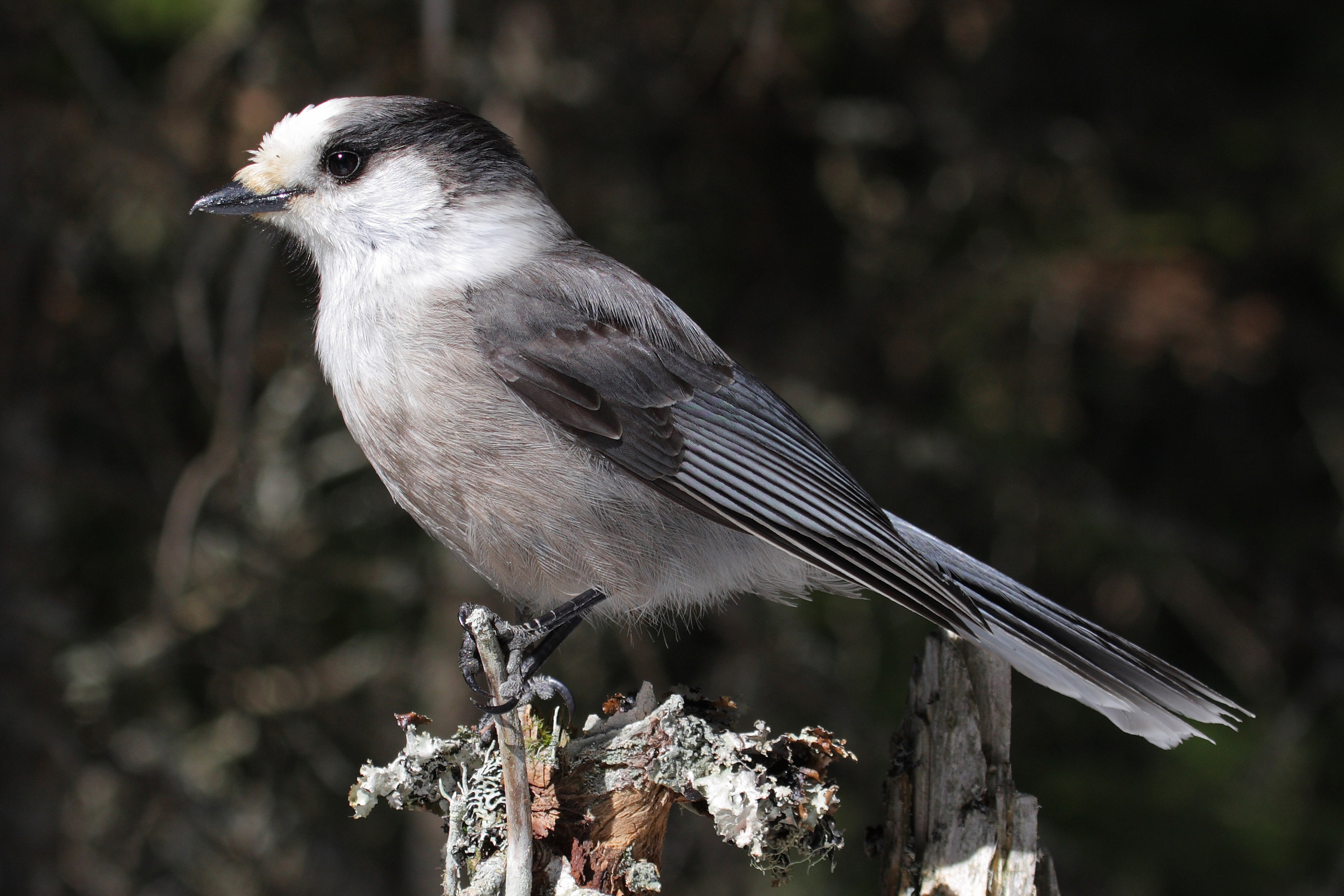
The Canada jay has been proposed as the national bird of Canada.

This is a list of bird species confirmed in Canada. Unless otherwise noted, the list is that of Bird Checklists of the World as of July 2022. Of the 704 species listed here, 236 are accidental. Thirteen species were introduced to North America or directly to Canada, three species are extinct, and three (possibly four) have been extirpated. One species of uncertain origin is also included.

This list is presented in the taxonomic sequence of the Check-list of North and Middle American Birds, 7th edition through the 63rd Supplement, published by the American Ornithological Society (AOS). Common and scientific names are also those of the Check-list, except that the common names of families are from the Clements taxonomy because the AOS list does not include them.

Canadian birds most closely resemble those of Eurasia, which was connected to the continent as part of the supercontinent Laurasia until around 60 million years ago. Many families which occur in Canada are also found throughout the Northern Hemisphere or worldwide. However, some families are unique to the New World; those represented in this list are the hummingbirds, the New World vultures, the New World quail, the tyrant flycatchers, the mimids, the wood-warblers, the cardinals, and the icterids. Three species on the list (Ross's goose, whooping crane, and Harris's sparrow) breed only in Canada. The extinct Labrador duck is also believed to have been a breeding endemic, though its breeding areas are not known.

Unless otherwise noted, all species listed below are considered to occur regularly in Canada as permanent residents, summer or winter visitors, or migrants. These tags are used to annotate some species:

- (A) Accidental - a species that rarely or accidentally occurs in Canada
- (I) Introduced - a species introduced to Canada as a consequence, direct or indirect, of human actions
- (E) Extinct - a recent species which no longer exists
- (Ex) Extirpated - a species which no longer occurs in Canada but exists elsewhere

Population status symbols are those of the Red List published by the International Union for Conservation of Nature (IUCN). The symbols apply to the species' worldwide status, not their status solely in Canada. The symbols and their meanings, in decreasing order of peril, are:

EX	Extinct	No reasonable doubt that the last individual has died.
EW	Extinct in the wild	Known only to survive in captivity or as a naturalized population well outside its previous range.
CR	Critically endangered	The species is in imminent risk of extinction in the wild.
EN	Endangered	The species is facing an extremely high risk of extinction in the wild.
VU	Vulnerable	The species is facing a high risk of extinction in the wild.
NT	Near threatened	The species does not meet any of the criteria that would categorise it as risking extinction but it is likely to do so in the future.
LC	Least concern	There are no current identifiable risks to the species.
DD	Data deficient	There is inadequate information to make an assessment of the risks to this species.

== Ducks, geese, and waterfowl ==
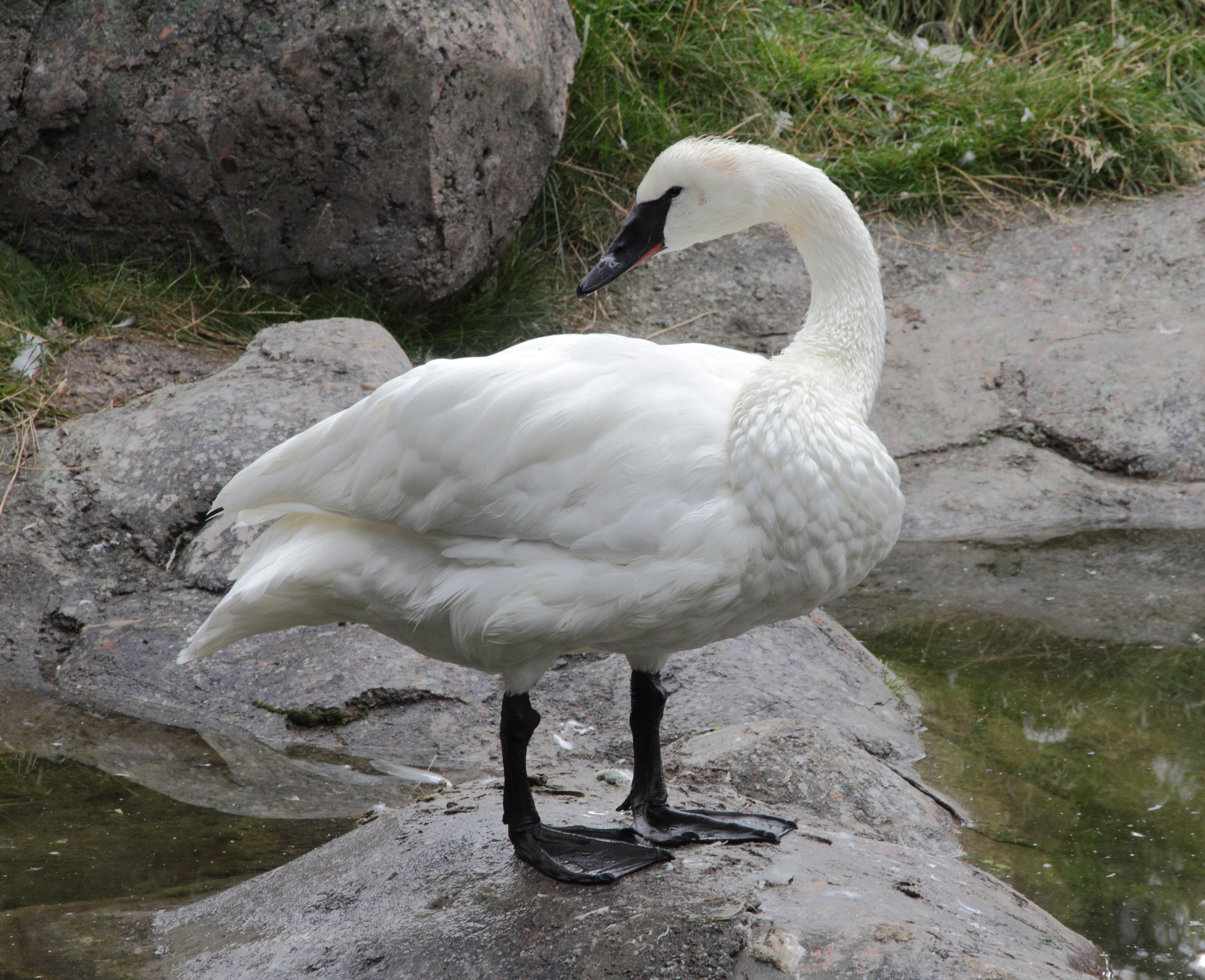
Trumpeter swan

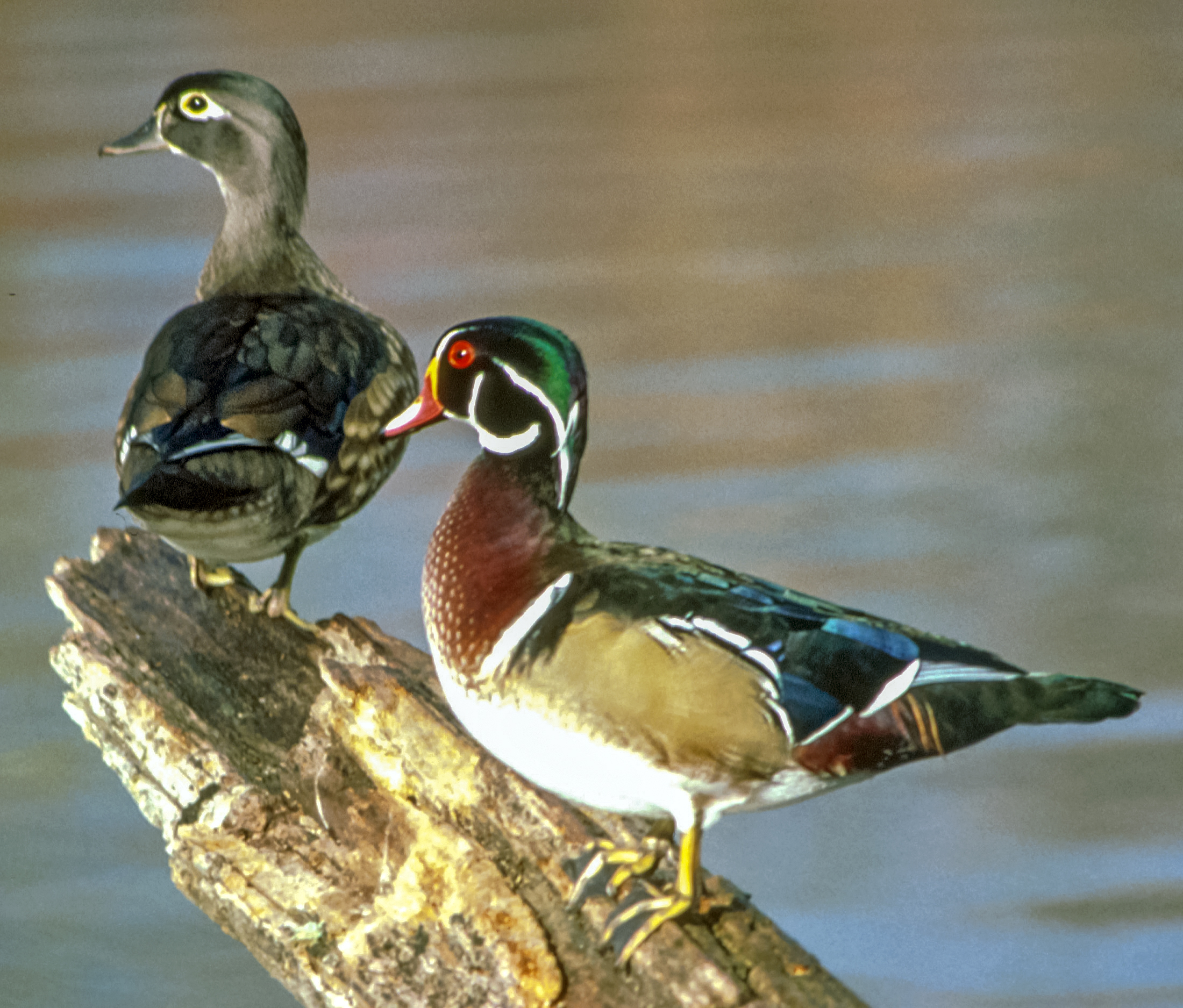
Wood duck pair (female on right, male on left)

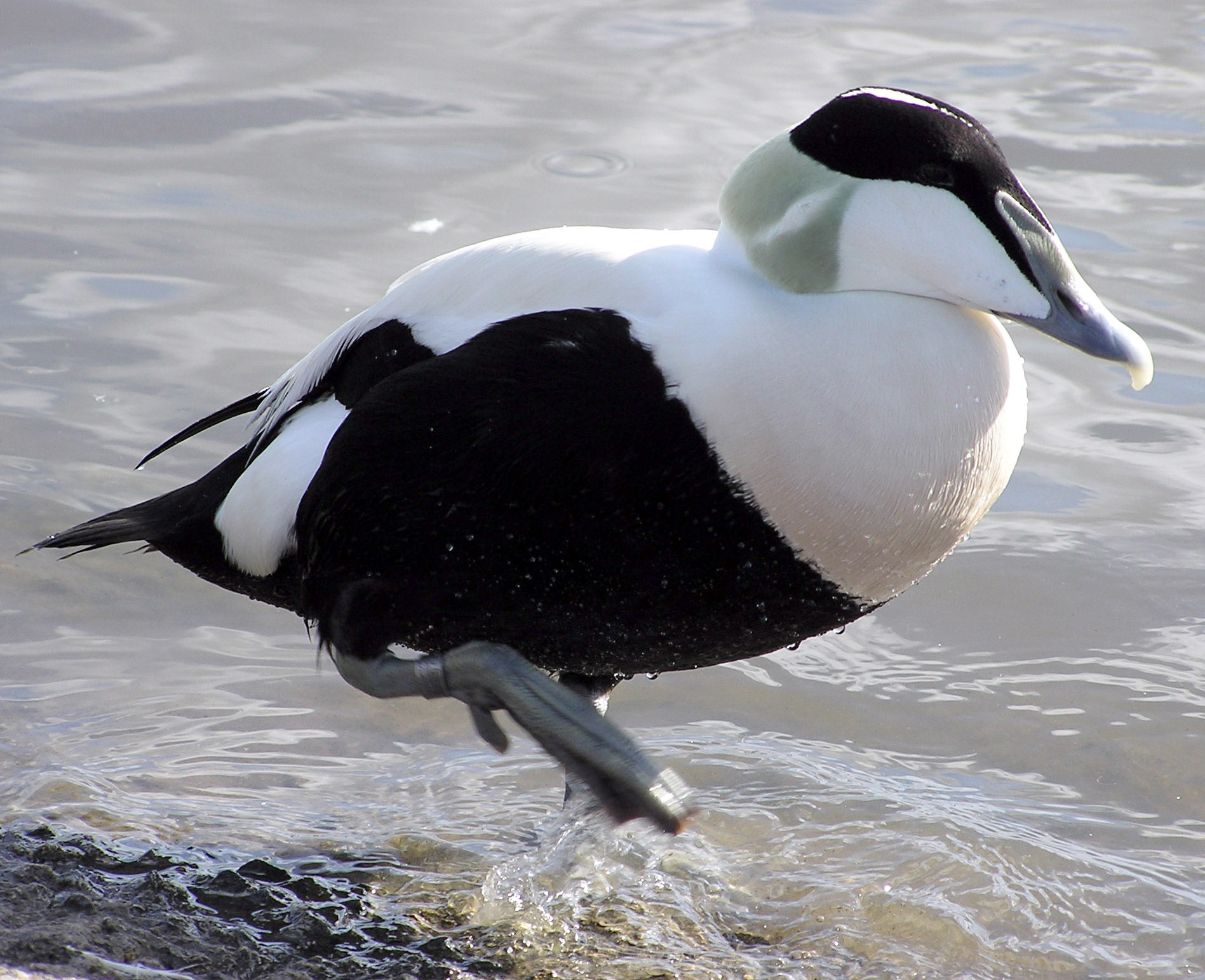
Common eider

Order: Anseriformes Family: Anatidae

The family Anatidae includes the ducks and most duck-like waterfowl, such as geese and swans. These birds are adapted to an aquatic existence with webbed feet, bills which are flattened to a greater or lesser extent, and feathers that are excellent at shedding water due to special oils.

- Black-bellied whistling-duck, Dendrocygna autumnalis (A) LC
- Fulvous whistling-duck, Dendrocygna bicolor (A) LC
- Emperor goose, Anser canagica (A) NT
- Snow goose, Anser caerulescens LC
- Ross's goose, Anser rossii LC
- Greylag goose, Anser anser (A) LC
- Greater white-fronted goose, Anser albifrons LC
- Taiga bean-goose, Anser fabalis (A) LC
- Tundra bean-goose, Anser serrirostris (A) LC
- Pink-footed goose, Anser brachyrhynchus (A) LC
- Brant, Branta bernicla LC
- Barnacle goose, Branta leucopsis (A) LC
- Cackling goose, Branta hutchinsii LC
- Canada goose, Branta canadensis LC
- Mute swan, Cygnus olor (I) LC
- Trumpeter swan, Cygnus buccinator LC
- Tundra swan, Cygnus columbianus LC
- Whooper swan, Cygnus cygnus (A) LC
- Ruddy shelduck, Tadorna ferruginea (A) LC
- Common shelduck, Tadorna tadorna (A) LC
- Wood duck, Aix sponsa LC
- Baikal teal, Sibirionetta formosa (A) LC
- Garganey, Spatula querquedula (A) LC
- Blue-winged teal, Spatula discors LC
- Cinnamon teal, Spatula cyanoptera LC
- Northern shoveler, Spatula clypeata LC
- Gadwall, Mareca strepera LC
- Falcated duck, Mareca falcata (A) NT
- Eurasian wigeon, Mareca penelope LC
- American wigeon, Mareca americana LC
- Mallard, Anas platyrhynchos LC
- American black duck, Anas rubripes LC
- Mottled duck, Anas fulvigula (A) LC
- Northern pintail, Anas acuta LC
- Green-winged teal, Anas crecca LC
- Canvasback, Aythya valisineria LC
- Redhead, Aythya americana LC
- Common pochard, Aythya ferina (A) VU
- Ring-necked duck, Aythya collaris LC
- Tufted duck, Aythya fuligula (A) LC
- Greater scaup, Aythya marila LC
- Lesser scaup, Aythya affinis LC
- Steller's eider, Polysticta stelleri (A) VU
- Spectacled eider, Somateria fischeri (A) NT
- King eider, Somateria spectabilis LC
- Common eider, Somateria mollissima NT
- Harlequin duck, Histrionicus histrionicus LC
- Labrador duck, Camptorhynchus labradorius (E) EX
- Surf scoter, Melanitta perspicillata LC
- White-winged scoter, Melanitta deglandi LC
- Common scoter, Melanitta nigra LC
- Black scoter, Melanitta americana NT
- Long-tailed duck, Clangula hyemalis VU
- Bufflehead, Bucephala albeola LC
- Common goldeneye, Bucephala clangula LC
- Barrow's goldeneye, Bucephala islandica LC
- Smew, Mergellus albellus (A) LC
- Hooded merganser, Lophodytes cucullatus LC
- Common merganser, Mergus merganser LC
- Red-breasted merganser, Mergus serrator LC
- Ruddy duck, Oxyura jamaicensis LC

== New World quail ==
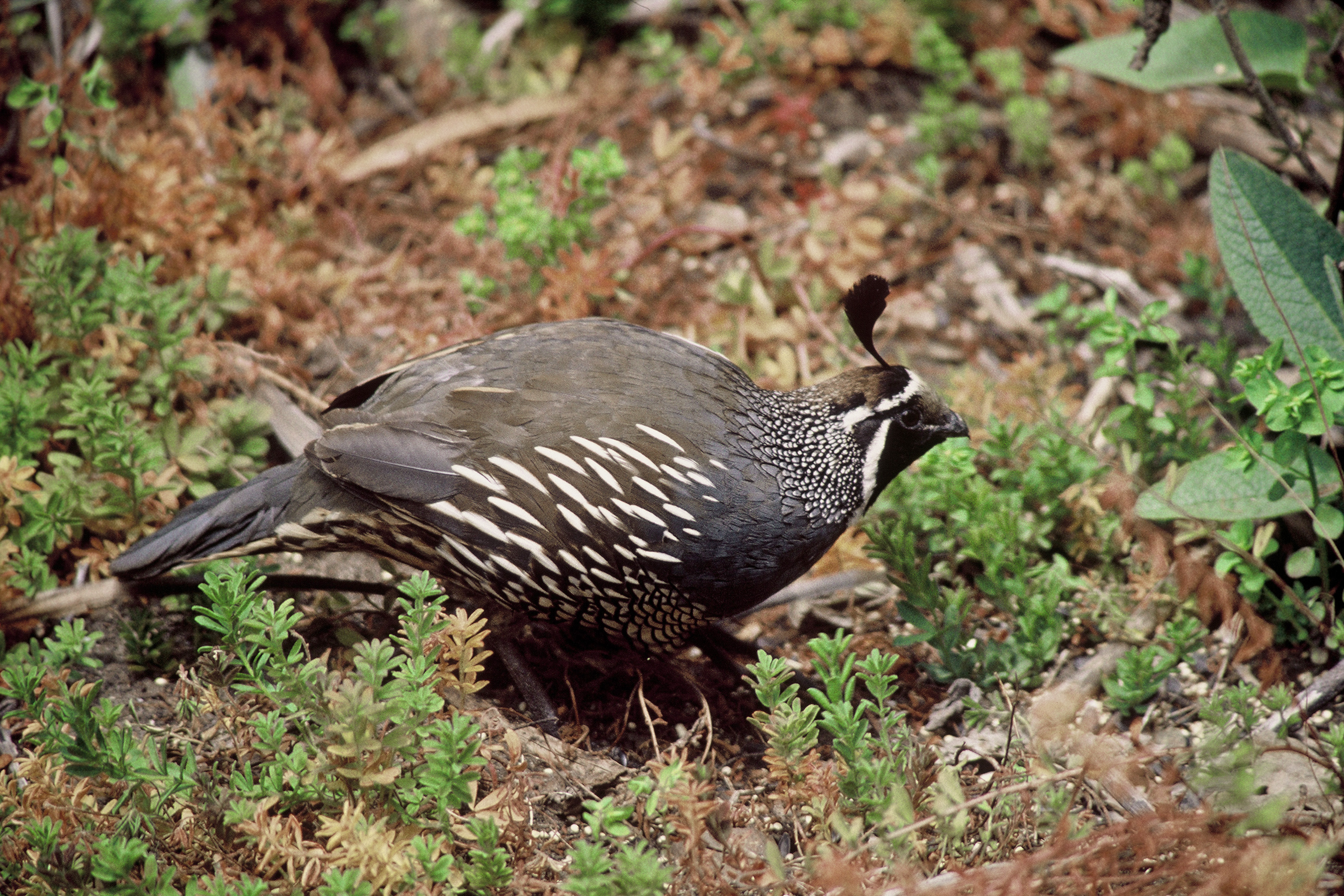
California quail

Order: Galliformes Family: Odontophoridae

The New World quails are small, plump terrestrial birds only distantly related to the quails of the Old World, but named for their similar appearance and habits.

- Mountain quail, Oreortyx ictus (I) (Note: Mountain quail was introduced to Vancouver Island.) LC
- Northern bobwhite, Colinus virginianus NT
- California quail, Callipepla californica (I) (Note: California quail were directly introduced to Vancouver Island. The population in eastern British Columbia was either directly introduced or spread north from an introduced population in Washington.) LC

== Pheasants, grouse, and allies ==
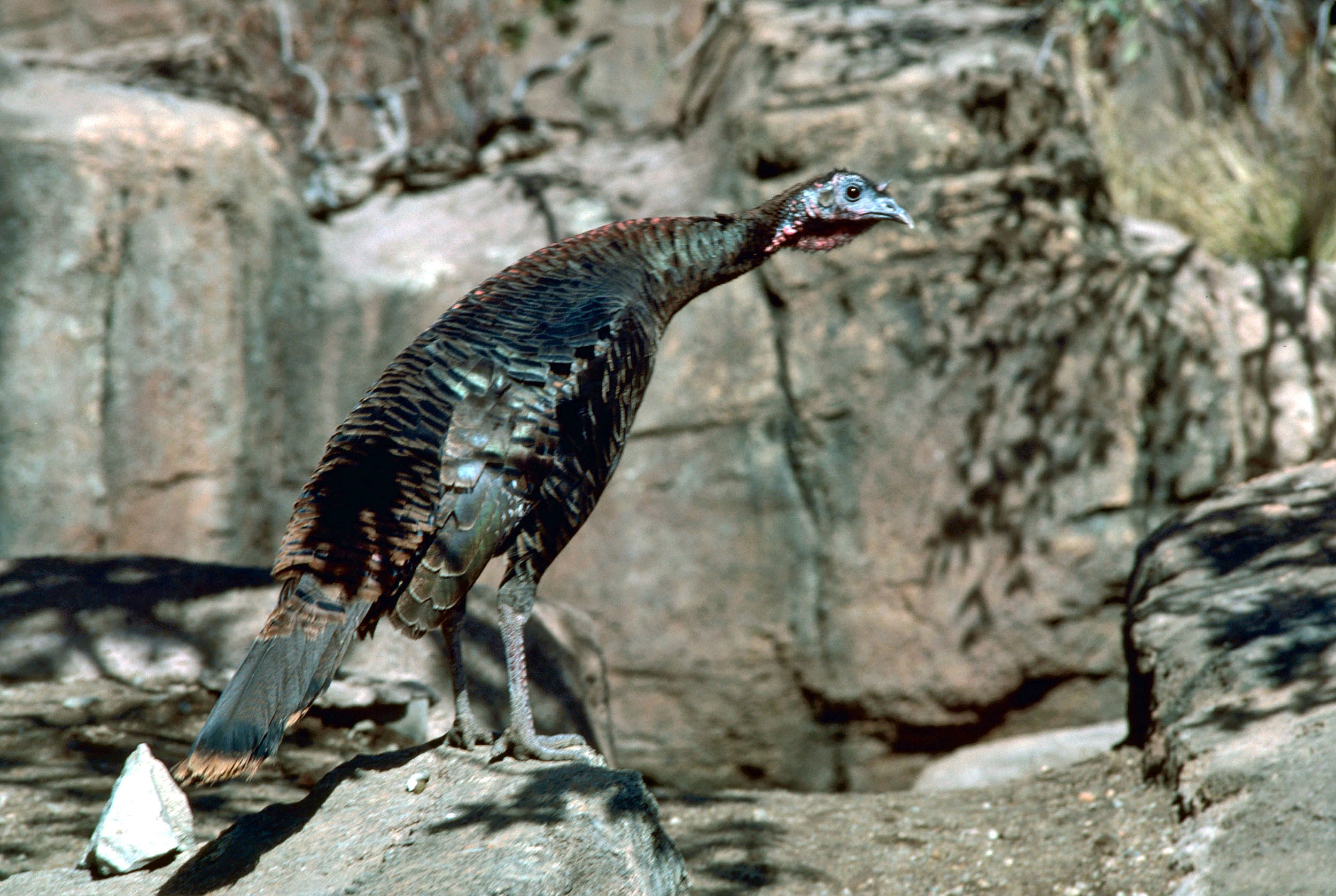
Wild turkey

Order: Galliformes Family: Phasianidae

Phasianidae consists of the pheasants and their allies. These are terrestrial species, variable in size but generally plump with broad relatively short wings. Many species are gamebirds or have been domesticated as a food source for humans.

- Wild turkey, Meleagris gallopavo LC
- Ruffed grouse, Bonasa umbellus LC
- Greater sage-grouse, Centrocercus urophasianus NT
- Spruce grouse, Canachites canadensis LC
- Willow ptarmigan, Lagopus lagopus LC
- Rock ptarmigan, Lagopus muta LC
- White-tailed ptarmigan, Lagopus leucura LC
- Dusky grouse, Dendragapus obscurus LC
- Sooty grouse, Dendragapus fuliginosus LC
- Sharp-tailed grouse, Tympanuchus phasianellus LC
- Greater prairie-chicken, Tympanuchus cupido (Ex) (Note: Greater prairie-chicken has been extirpated as a self-sustaining population, though there have been scattered sightings in Manitoba and Ontario.) NT
- Grey partridge, Perdix perdix (I) LC
- Ring-necked pheasant, Phasianus colchicus (I) LC
- Silver pheasant, Lophura nycthemera (I) (LC)
- Chukar, Alectoris chukar (I) LC

== Flamingos ==
Order: Phoenicopteriformes Family: Phoenicopteridae

Flamingos (genus Phoenicopterus monotypic in family Phoenicopteridae) are gregarious wading birds, usually 3 to 5 feet (0.9 to 1.5 m) tall, found in both the Western and Eastern Hemispheres. Flamingos filter-feed on shellfish and algae. Their oddly-shaped beaks are specially adapted to separate mud and silt from the food they consume and, uniquely, are used upside-down.

Flamingos are not native to Canada. Wild sightings are extremely rare, although some have been documented.

- American flamingo, Phoenicopterus ruber (A) LC

== Grebes ==
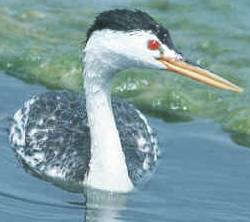
Clark's grebe

Order: Podicipediformes Family: Podicipedidae

Grebes are small to medium-large freshwater diving birds. They have lobed toes and are excellent swimmers and divers. However, they have their feet placed far back on the body, making them quite ungainly on land.

- Pied-billed grebe, Podilymbus podiceps LC
- Horned grebe, Podiceps auritus VU
- Red-necked grebe, Podiceps grisegena LC
- Eared grebe, Podiceps nigricollis LC
- Western grebe, Aechmophorus occidentalis LC
- Clark's grebe, Aechmophorus clarkii LC

== Pigeons and doves ==
Order: Columbiformes Family: Columbidae

Pigeons and doves are stout-bodied birds with short necks and short slender bills with a fleshy cere.

- Rock pigeon, Columba livia (I) LC
- Common wood pigeon, Columba palumbus (A) LC
- White-crowned pigeon, Patagioenas leucocephala (A) NT
- Band-tailed pigeon, Patagioenas fasciata LC
- Oriental turtle-dove, Streptopelia orientalis (A) LC
- Eurasian collared-dove, Streptopelia decaocto (I) LC
- Passenger pigeon, Ectopistes migratorius (E) EX
- Inca dove, Columbina inca (A) LC
- Common ground dove, Columbina passerina (A) LC
- White-winged dove, Zenaida asiatica (A) LC
- Mourning dove, Zenaida macroura LC

== Cuckoos ==
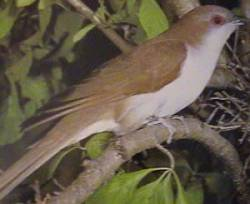
Black-billed cuckoo

Order: Cuculiformes Family: Cuculidae

The family Cuculidae includes cuckoos, roadrunners, and anis. These birds are of variable size with slender bodies, long tails, and strong legs.

- Groove-billed ani, Crotophaga sulcirostris (A) LC
- Common cuckoo, Cuculus canorus (A) LC
- Yellow-billed cuckoo, Coccyzus americanus LC
- Black-billed cuckoo, Coccyzus erythropthalmus LC

== Nightjars and allies ==
Order: Caprimulgiformes Family: Caprimulgidae

Nightjars are medium-sized nocturnal birds that usually nest on the ground. They have long wings, short legs, and very short bills. Most have small feet, of little use for walking, and long pointed wings. Their soft plumage is cryptically coloured to resemble bark or leaves.

- Lesser nighthawk, Chordeiles acutipennis LC
- Common nighthawk, Chordeiles minor LC
- Common poorwill, Phalaenoptilus nuttallii LC
- Chuck-will's-widow, Antrostomus carolinensis LC
- Eastern whip-poor-will, Antrostomus vociferus NT

== Swifts ==
Order: Apodiformes Family: Apodidae

The swifts are small birds which spend the majority of their lives flying. These birds have very short legs and never settle voluntarily on the ground, perching instead only on vertical surfaces. Many swifts have long swept-back wings which resemble a crescent or boomerang.

- Black swift, Cypseloides niger VU
- White-collared swift, Streptoprocne zonaris (A) LC
- Chimney swift, Chaetura pelagica VU
- Vaux's swift, Chaetura vauxi LC
- Common swift, Apus apus (A) LC
- Pacific swift, Apus pacificus (A) LC
- House swift, Apus nipalensis (Note: "A [house swift] carcass...found in Ladner, British Columbia on 18 May 2012 appears to be the first documented record of this species in the Americas." In 2019 the species was added to the AOS Check-list appendix because it is not certain if it died before or after crossing into Canadian waters.) LC
- White-throated swift, Aeronautes saxatalis LC

== Hummingbirds ==
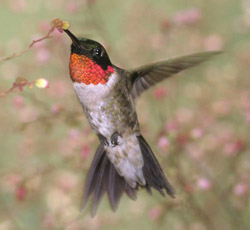
Ruby-throated hummingbird

Order: Apodiformes Family: Trochilidae

Hummingbirds are small birds capable of hovering in mid-air due to the rapid flapping of their wings. They are the only birds that can fly backwards.

- Mexican violetear, Colibri thalassinus (A) LC
- Rivoli's hummingbird, Eugenes fulgens (A) (Not yet assessed by the IUCN)
- Amethyst-throated mountain-gem, Lampornis amethystinus (A) LC
- Ruby-throated hummingbird, Archilochus colubris LC
- Black-chinned hummingbird, Archilochus alexandri LC
- Anna's hummingbird, Calypte anna LC
- Costa's hummingbird, Calypte costae (A) LC
- Calliope hummingbird, Selasphorus calliope LC
- Rufous hummingbird, Selasphorus rufus NT
- Broad-tailed hummingbird, Selasphorus platycercus (A) LC
- Broad-billed hummingbird, Cynanthus latirostris (A) LC
- Xantus's hummingbird, Basilinna xantusii (A) LC

== Rails, gallinules, and coots ==
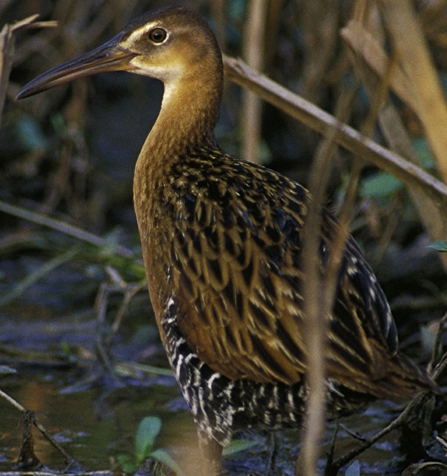
King rail

Order: Gruiformes Family: Rallidae

Rallidae is a large family of small to medium-sized birds which includes the rails, crakes, coots, and gallinules. Typically, family members occupy dense vegetation in damp environments near lakes, swamps, and rivers. In general they are shy and secretive birds, making them difficult to observe. Most species have strong legs and long toes which are well adapted to soft uneven surfaces. They tend to have short, rounded wings and to be weak flyers.

- Clapper rail, Rallus crepitans (A) LC
- King rail, Rallus elegans NT
- Virginia rail, Rallus limicola LC
- Corn crake, Crex crex (A) LC
- Sora, Porzana carolina LC
- Common gallinule, Gallinula galeata LC
- Eurasian coot, Fulica atra (A) LC
- American coot, Fulica americana LC
- Purple gallinule, Porphyrio martinicus (A) LC
- Yellow rail, Coturnicops noveboracensis LC
- Black rail, Laterallus jamaicensis (A) LC

== Limpkin ==
Limpkin

Order: Gruiformes Family: Aramidae

The limpkin is an odd bird that looks like a large rail, but is skeletally closer to the cranes. It is found in marshes with some trees or scrub in the Caribbean, South America, and southern Florida.

- Limpkin, Aramus guarauna (A) LC

== Cranes ==
Order: Gruiformes Family: Gruidae

Cranes are large, long-legged, and long-necked birds. Unlike the similar-looking, but unrelated, herons, cranes fly with their necks outstretched, not pulled back. Most have elaborate and noisy courting displays.

- Sandhill crane, Antigone canadensis LC
- Common crane, Grus grus (C) LC
- Whooping crane, Grus americana EN

== Stilts and avocets ==
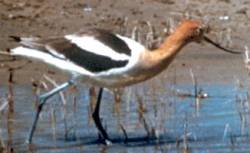
American avocet

Order: Charadriiformes Family: Recurvirostridae

Recurvirostridae is a family of large wading birds which includes the avocets and stilts. The avocets have long legs and long up-curved bills. The stilts have extremely long legs and long, thin, straight bills.

- Black-necked stilt, Himantopus mexicanus LC
- American avocet, Recurvirostra americana LC

== Oystercatchers ==
Order: Charadriiformes Family: Haematopodidae

The oystercatchers are large, obvious and noisy plover-like birds, with strong bills used for smashing or prying open molluscs.

- Eurasian oystercatcher, Haematopus ostralegus (A) NT
- American oystercatcher, Haematopus palliatus (A) LC
- Black oystercatcher, Haematopus bachmani LC

== Plovers and lapwings ==
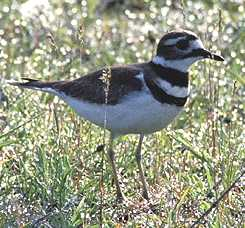
Killdeer

Order: Charadriiformes Family: Charadriidae

The family Charadriidae includes the plovers, dotterels, and lapwings. They are small to medium-sized birds with compact bodies, short thick necks, and long, usually pointed, wings. They are found in open country worldwide, mostly in habitats near water.

- Northern lapwing, Vanellus vanellus (A) NT
- Black-bellied plover, Pluvialis squatarola LC
- European golden-plover, Pluvialis apricaria (A) LC
- American golden-plover, Pluvialis dominica LC
- Pacific golden-plover, Pluvialis fulva (A) LC
- Eurasian dotterel, Charadrius morinellus (A) LC
- Killdeer, Charadrius vociferus LC
- Common ringed plover, Charadrius hiaticula LC
- Semipalmated plover, Charadrius semipalmatus LC
- Piping plover, Charadrius melodus NT
- Lesser sand-plover, Charadrius mongolus (A) LC
- Wilson's plover, Charadrius wilsonia (A) LC
- Snowy plover, Charadrius nivosus (A) NT
- Mountain plover, Charadrius montanus NT

== Sandpipers and allies ==
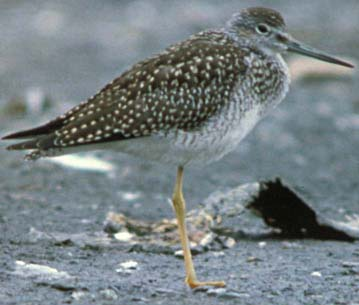
Greater yellowlegs

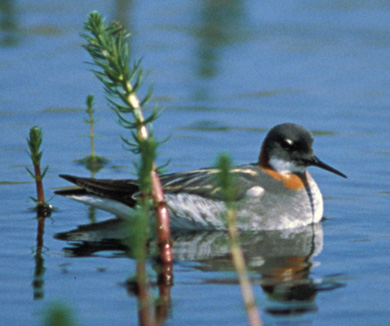
Red-necked phalarope

Order: Charadriiformes Family: Scolopacidae

Scolopacidae is a large, diverse family of small to medium-sized shorebirds including the sandpipers, curlews, godwits, shanks, tattlers, woodcocks, snipes, dowitchers, and phalaropes. The majority of these species eat small invertebrates picked out of the mud or soil. Different lengths of legs and bills enable multiple species to feed in the same habitat, particularly on the coast, without directly competing for food.

- Upland sandpiper, Bartramia longicauda LC
- Bristle-thighed curlew, Numenius tahitiensis (A) VU
- Whimbrel, Numenius phaeopus LC
- Eskimo curlew, Numenius borealis (Possibly extinct) CR
- Long-billed curlew, Numenius americanus LC
- Far Eastern curlew, Numenius madagascariensis (A) EN
- Slender-billed curlew, Numenius tenuirostris (A) CR
- Eurasian curlew, Numenius arquata (A) NT
- Bar-tailed godwit, Limosa lapponica (A) NT
- Black-tailed godwit, Limosa limosa (A) NT
- Hudsonian godwit, Limosa haemastica LC
- Marbled godwit, Limosa fedoa LC
- Ruddy turnstone, Arenaria interpres LC
- Black turnstone, Arenaria melanocephala LC
- Great knot, Calidris tenuirostris (A) EN
- Red knot, Calidris canutus LC
- Surfbird, Calidris virgata LC
- Ruff, Calidris pugnax LC
- Sharp-tailed sandpiper, Calidris acuminata VU
- Stilt sandpiper, Calidris himantopus LC
- Curlew sandpiper, Calidris ferruginea (A) NT
- Temminck's stint, Calidris temminckii (A) LC
- Spoon-billed sandpiper, Calidris pygmaea (A) CR
- Red-necked stint, Calidris ruficollis (A) NT
- Sanderling, Calidris alba LC
- Dunlin, Calidris alpina LC
- Rock sandpiper, Calidris ptilocnemis LC
- Purple sandpiper, Calidris maritima LC
- Baird's sandpiper, Calidris bairdii LC
- Little stint, Calidris minuta (A) LC
- Least sandpiper, Calidris minutilla LC
- White-rumped sandpiper, Calidris fuscicollis LC
- Buff-breasted sandpiper, Calidris subruficollis NT
- Pectoral sandpiper, Calidris melanotos LC
- Semipalmated sandpiper, Calidris pusilla NT
- Western sandpiper, Calidris mauri LC
- Short-billed dowitcher, Limnodromus griseus LC
- Long-billed dowitcher, Limnodromus scolopaceus LC
- Jack snipe, Lymnocryptes minimus (A) LC
- Eurasian woodcock, Scolopax rusticola (A) LC
- American woodcock, Scolopax minor LC
- Common snipe, Gallinago gallinago (A) LC
- Wilson's snipe, Gallinago delicata LC
- Terek sandpiper, Xenus cinereus (A) LC
- Spotted sandpiper, Actitis macularius LC
- Solitary sandpiper, Tringa solitaria LC
- Grey-tailed tattler, Tringa brevipes (A) NT
- Wandering tattler, Tringa incana LC
- Lesser yellowlegs, Tringa flavipes LC
- Willet, Tringa semipalmata LC
- Spotted redshank, Tringa erythropus (A) LC
- Common greenshank, Tringa nebularia (A) LC
- Greater yellowlegs, Tringa melanoleuca LC
- Common redshank, Tringa totanus (A) LC
- Marsh sandpiper, Tringa stagnatilis (A) LC
- Wood sandpiper, Tringa glareola (A) LC
- Wilson's phalarope, Phalaropus tricolor LC
- Red-necked phalarope, Phalaropus lobatus LC
- Red phalarope, Phalaropus fulicarius LC

== Skuas and jaegers ==
Order: Charadriiformes Family: Stercorariidae

Skuas are, in general, medium to large birds, typically with grey or brown plumage, often with white markings on the wings. They have longish bills with hooked tips and webbed feet with sharp claws. They look like large dark gulls, but have a fleshy cere above the upper mandible. They are strong, acrobatic fliers.

- Great skua, Stercorarius skua (A) LC
- South polar skua, Stercorarius maccormicki LC
- Brown skua, Stercorarius lonnbergi (A) LC
- Pomarine jaeger, Stercorarius pomarinus LC
- Parasitic jaeger, Stercorarius parasiticus LC
- Long-tailed jaeger, Stercorarius longicaudus LC

== Auks, murres, and puffins ==
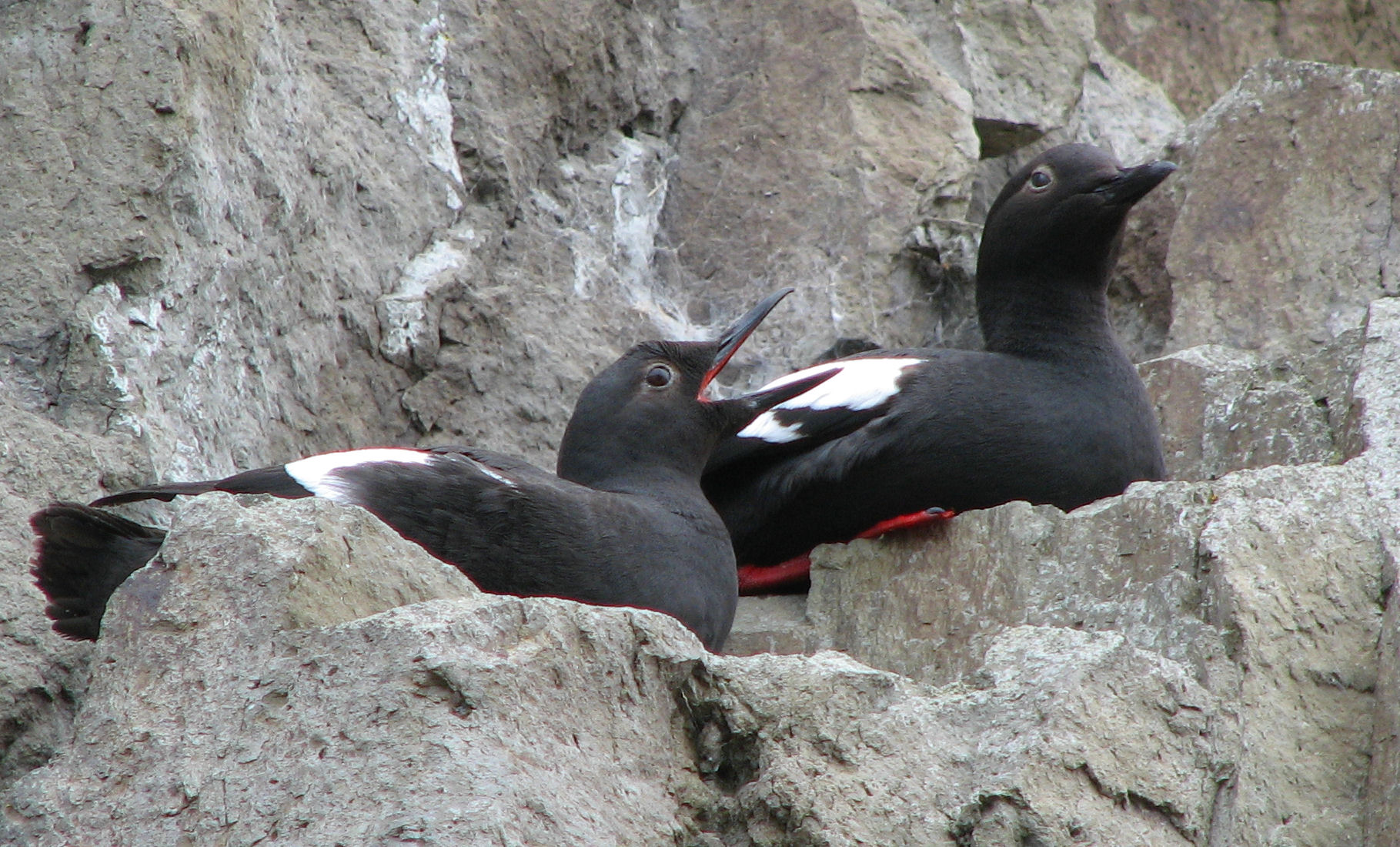
Pigeon guillemot

Order: Charadriiformes Family: Alcidae

Alcids are superficially similar to penguins due to their black-and-white colours, their upright posture, and some of their habits. However they are only distantly related to the penguins and are able to fly. Auks live on the open sea, only deliberately coming ashore to nest.

- Dovekie, Alle alle LC
- Common murre, Uria aalge LC
- Thick-billed murre, Uria lomvia LC
- Razorbill, Alca torda NT
- Great auk, Pinguinus impennis (E) EX
- Black guillemot, Cepphus grylle LC
- Pigeon guillemot, Cepphus columba LC
- Long-billed murrelet, Brachyramphus perdix (A) NT
- Marbled murrelet, Brachyramphus marmoratus EN
- Kittlitz's murrelet, Brachyramphus brevirostris (A) NT
- Scripps's murrelet, Synthliboramphus scrippsi VU
- Guadalupe murrelet, Synthliboramphus hypoleucus (A) EN
- Ancient murrelet, Synthliboramphus antiquus LC
- Cassin's auklet, Ptychoramphus aleuticus NT
- Parakeet auklet, Aethia psittacula LC
- Least auklet, Aethia pusilla (A) LC
- Crested auklet, Aethia cristatella (A) LC
- Rhinoceros auklet, Cerorhinca monocerata LC
- Atlantic puffin, Fratercula arctica VU
- Horned puffin, Fratercula corniculata LC
- Tufted puffin, Fratercula cirrhata LC

== Gulls, terns, and skimmers ==
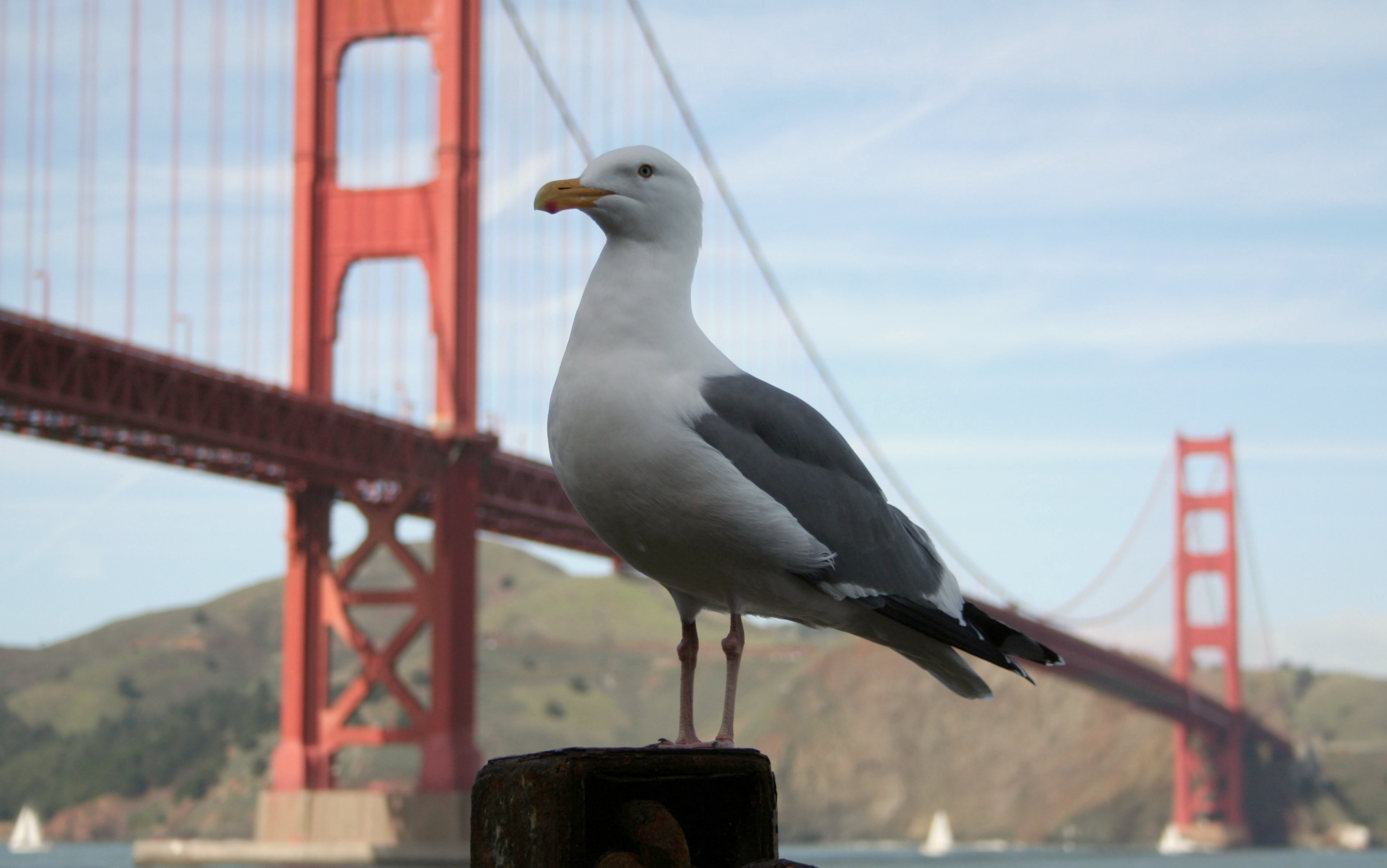
A western gull in front of the Golden Gate Bridge in San Francisco

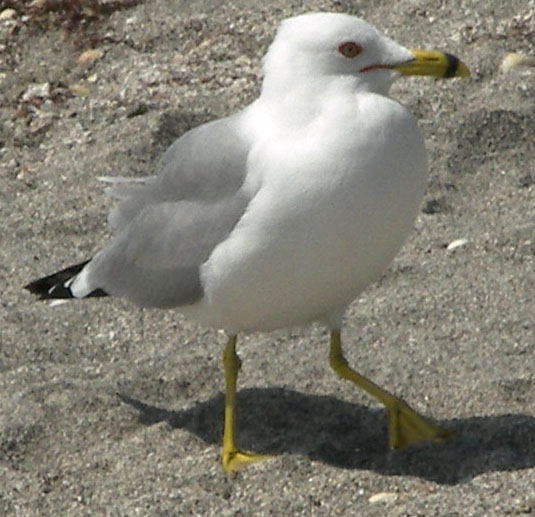
Ring-billed gull

Order: Charadriiformes Family: Laridae

Laridae is a family of medium to large seabirds and includes gulls, terns, and skimmers. Gulls are typically grey or white, often with black markings on the head or wings. They have stout, longish bills, and webbed feet. Terns are a group of generally medium to large seabirds typically with grey or white plumage, often with black markings on the head. Most terns hunt fish by diving but some pick insects off the surface of fresh water. Terns are generally long-lived birds, with several species known to live in excess of 30 years. Skimmers are a small family of tropical tern-like birds. They have an elongated lower mandible which they use to feed by flying low over the water surface and skimming the water for small fish.

- Black-legged kittiwake, Rissa tridactyla VU
- Red-legged kittiwake, Rissa brevirostris (A) VU
- Ivory gull, Pagophila eburnea NT
- Sabine's gull, Xema sabini LC
- Bonaparte's gull, Chroicocephalus philadelphia LC
- Black-headed gull, Chroicocephalus ridibundus LC
- Little gull, Hydrocoloeus minutus LC
- Ross's gull, Rhodostethia rosea LC
- Laughing gull, Leucophaeus atricilla LC
- Franklin's gull, Leucophaeus pipixcan LC
- Black-tailed gull, Larus crassirostris (A) LC
- Heermann's gull, Larus heermanni NT
- Common gull, Larus canus (A) LC
- Short-billed gull, Larus brachyrhynchus
- Ring-billed gull, Larus delawarensis LC
- Western gull, Larus occidentalis LC
- California gull, Larus californicus LC
- Herring gull, Larus argentatus LC
- Yellow-legged gull, Larus cachinnans (A) LC
- Iceland gull, Larus glaucoides LC
- Lesser black-backed gull, Larus fuscus LC
- Slaty-backed gull, Larus schistisagus (A) LC
- Glaucous-winged gull, Larus glaucescens LC
- Glaucous gull, Larus hyperboreus LC
- Great black-backed gull, Larus marinus LC
- Kelp gull, Larus dominicanus (A) LC
- Sooty tern, Onychoprion fuscatus (A) LC
- Bridled tern, Onychoprion anaethetus (A) LC
- Aleutian tern, Onychoprion aleuticus (A) LC
- Least tern, Sternula antillarum (A) LC
- Gull-billed tern, Gelochelidon nilotica (A) LC
- Caspian tern, Hydroprogne caspia LC
- Black tern, Chlidonias niger LC
- White-winged tern, Chlidonias leucopterus (A) LC
- Roseate tern, Sterna dougallii LC
- Common tern, Sterna hirundo LC
- Arctic tern, Sterna paradisaea LC
- Forster's tern, Sterna forsteri LC
- Royal tern, Thalasseus maximus (A) LC
- Sandwich tern, Thalasseus sandvicensis (A) LC
- Cabot's tern, Thalasseus acuflavidus (A)
- Elegant tern, Thalasseus elegans (A) NT
- Black skimmer, Rynchops niger (A) LC

== Tropicbirds ==
Order: Phaethontiformes Family: Phaethontidae

Tropicbirds are slender white birds of tropical oceans with exceptionally long central tail feathers. Their long wings have black markings, as does the head.

- White-tailed tropicbird, Phaethon lepturus (A) LC
- Red-billed tropicbird, Phaethon aethereus (A) LC
- Red-tailed tropicbird, Phaethon rubricauda (A) LC

== Loons ==
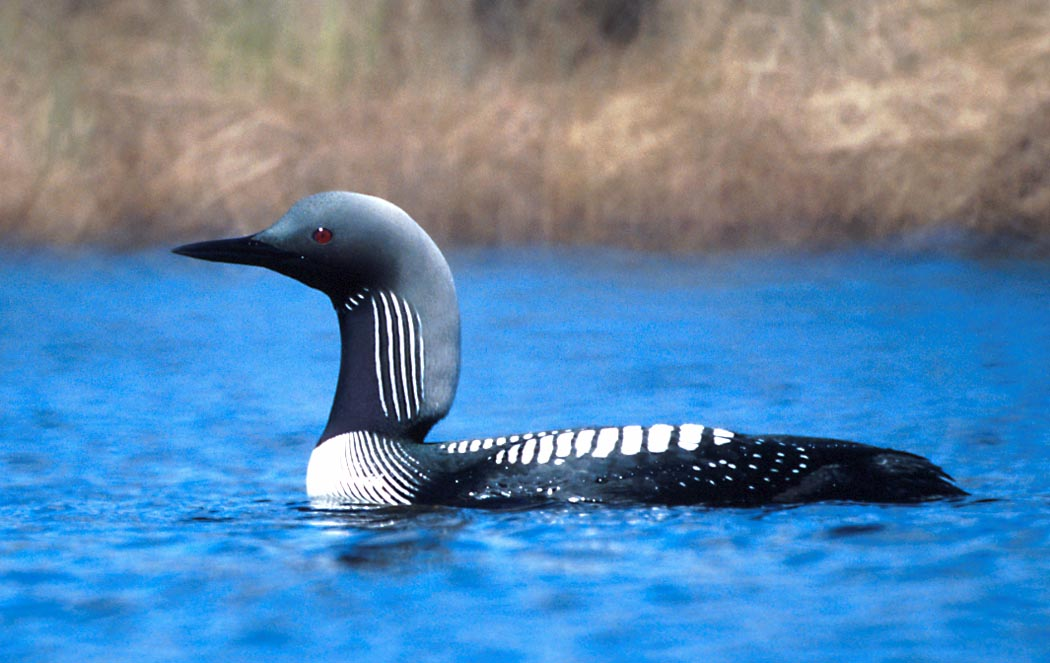
Pacific loon

Order: Gaviiformes Family: Gaviidae

Loons are aquatic birds the size of a large duck, to which they are unrelated. Their plumage is largely grey or black, and they have spear-shaped bills. Loons swim well and fly adequately, but, because their legs are placed towards the rear of the body, are almost helpless on land.

The common loon is the official bird of Ontario, Canada. The Canadian one dollar coin features a loon, and because of this, it is informally referred to as the "loonie".

- Red-throated loon, Gavia stellata LC
- Arctic loon, Gavia arctica (A) LC
- Pacific loon, Gavia pacifica LC
- Common loon, Gavia immer LC
- Yellow-billed loon, Gavia adamsii NT

== Albatrosses ==
Order: Procellariiformes Family: Diomedeidae

The albatrosses are amongst the largest of flying birds, and the great albatrosses from the genus Diomedea have the largest wingspans of any extant birds.

- Yellow-nosed albatross, Thalassar chlororhynchus (A) EN
- Black-browed albatross, Thalassarche melanophris (A) LC
- Laysan albatross, Phoebastria immutabilis NT
- Black-footed albatross, Phoebastria nigripes NT
- Short-tailed albatross, Phoebastria albatrus VU

== Southern storm-petrels ==
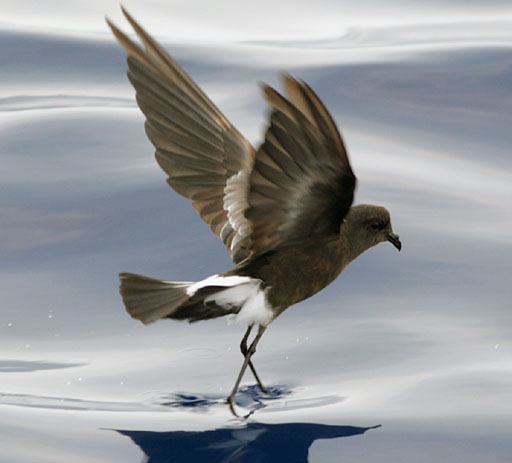
Wilson's storm-petrel

Order: Procellariiformes Family: Oceanitidae

The storm-petrels are the smallest seabirds, relatives of the petrels, feeding on planktonic crustaceans and small fish picked from the surface, typically while hovering. The flight is fluttering and sometimes bat-like. Until 2018, this family's three species were included with the other storm-petrels in family Hydrobatidae.

- Wilson's storm-petrel, Oceanites oceanicus LC
- White-faced storm-petrel, (A) Pelagodroma marina LC

== Northern storm-petrels ==
Order: Procellariiformes Family: Hydrobatidae

Though the members of this family are similar in many respects to the southern storm-petrels, including their general appearance and habits, there are enough genetic differences to warrant their placement in a separate family.

- European storm-petrel, Hydrobates pelagicus (A) LC
- Fork-tailed storm-petrel, Hydrobates furcatus LC
- Leach's storm-petrel, Hydrobates leucorhous LC
- Band-rumped storm-petrel, Hydrobates castro (A) LC

== Shearwaters and petrels ==
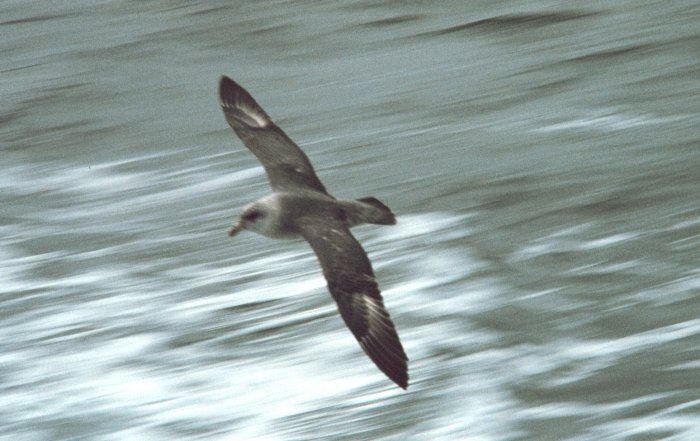
Northern fulmar

Order: Procellariiformes Family: Procellariidae

The procellariids are the main group of medium-sized "true petrels", characterized by united nostrils with medium septum and a long outer functional primary.

- Northern fulmar, Fulmarus glacialis LC
- Trindade petrel, Pterodroma arminjoniana (VU)
- Murphy's petrel, Pterodroma ultima (A) LC
- Mottled petrel, Pterodroma inexpectata (A) NT
- Bermuda petrel, Pterodroma cahow (A) EN
- Black-capped petrel, Pterodroma hasitata (A) EN
- Hawaiian petrel, Pterodroma sandwichensis (A) EN
- Fea's petrel, Pterodroma feae (A) NT
- Cook's petrel, Pterodroma cookii (A) VU
- Cory's shearwater, Calonectris diomedea LC
- Buller's shearwater, Ardenna bulleri VU
- Short-tailed shearwater, Ardenna tenuirostris LC
- Sooty shearwater, Ardenna griseus NT
- Great shearwater, Ardenna gravis LC
- Pink-footed shearwater, Ardenna creatopus VU
- Flesh-footed shearwater, Ardenna carneipes (A) NT
- Manx shearwater, Puffinus puffinus LC
- Black-vented shearwater, Puffinus opisthomelas (A) NT
- Sargasso shearwater, Puffinus lherminieri (A) LC
- Barolo shearwater, Puffinus baroli (A) (Not yet assessed by the IUCN)

== Storks ==
Order: Ciconiiformes Family: Ciconiidae

Storks are large, heavy, long-legged, long-necked wading birds with long stout bills and wide wingspans. They lack the powder down that other wading birds such as herons, spoonbills and ibises use to clean off fish slime. Storks lack a pharynx and are mute.

- Wood stork, Mycteria americana (A) LC

== Frigatebirds ==
Order: Suliformes Family: Fregatidae

Frigatebirds are large seabirds usually found over tropical oceans. They are large, black, or black-and-white birds, with long wings and deeply forked tails. The males have coloured inflatable throat pouches. They do not swim or walk and cannot take off from a flat surface. Having the largest wingspan-to-body-weight ratio of any bird, they are essentially aerial, able to stay aloft for more than a week.

- Magnificent frigatebird, Fregata magnificens (A) LC

== Boobies and gannets ==
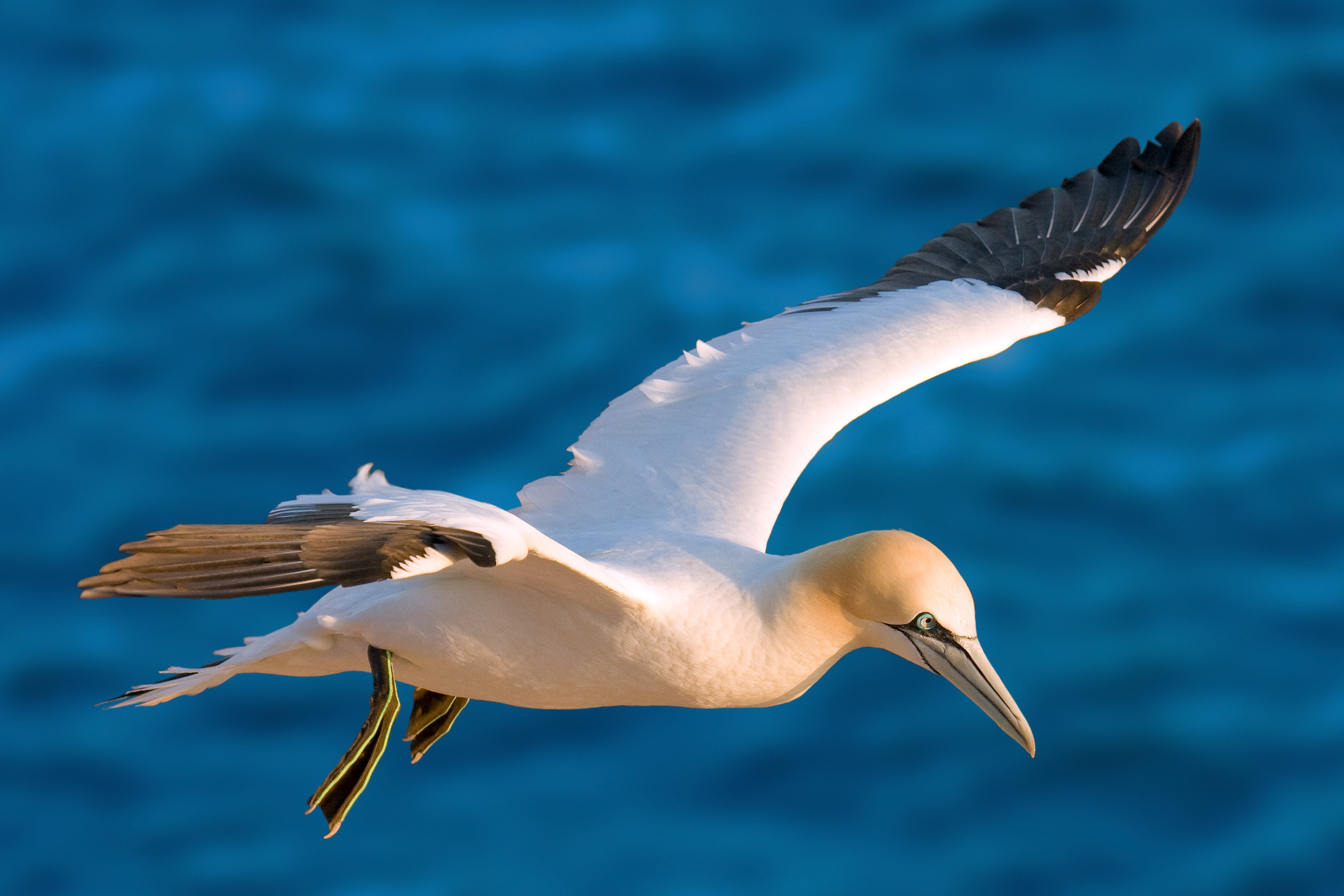
Northern gannet

Order: Suliformes Family: Sulidae

The sulids comprise the gannets and boobies. Both groups are medium-large coastal seabirds that plunge-dive for fish.

- Masked booby, Sula dactylatra (A) LC
- Nazca booby, Sula granti (A) LC
- Blue-footed booby, Sula nebouxii (A) LC
- Brown booby, Sula leucogaster (A) LC
- Red-footed booby, Sula sula (A) LC
- Northern gannet, Morus bassanus LC

== Anhingas ==
Order: Suliformes Family: Anhingidae

Anhingas are cormorant-like water birds with very long necks and long, straight beaks. They are fish eaters which often swim with only their neck above water.

- Anhinga, Anhinga anhinga (A) LC

== Cormorants and shags ==
Order: Suliformes Family: Phalacrocoracidae

Cormorants are medium-to-large aquatic birds, usually with mainly dark plumage and areas of coloured skin on the face. The bill is long, thin, and sharply hooked. Their feet are four-toed and webbed.

- Brandt's cormorant, Urile penicillatus LC
- Red-faced cormorant, Urile urile (A) LC
- Pelagic cormorant, Urile pelagicus LC
- Great cormorant, Phalacrocorax carbo LC
- Double-crested cormorant, Nannopterum auritum LC
- Neotropic cormorant, Nannopterum brasilianum (A) LC

== Pelicans ==
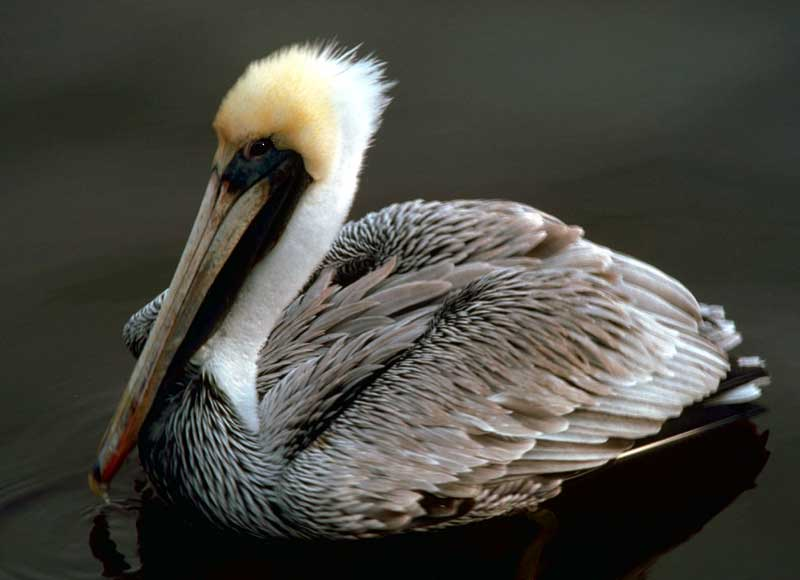
Brown pelican

Order: Pelecaniformes Family: Pelecanidae

Pelicans are very large water birds with a distinctive pouch under their beak. Like other birds in the order Pelecaniformes, they have four webbed toes.

- American white pelican, Pelecanus erythrorhynchos LC
- Brown pelican, Pelecanus occidentalis LC

== Herons, egrets, and bitterns ==
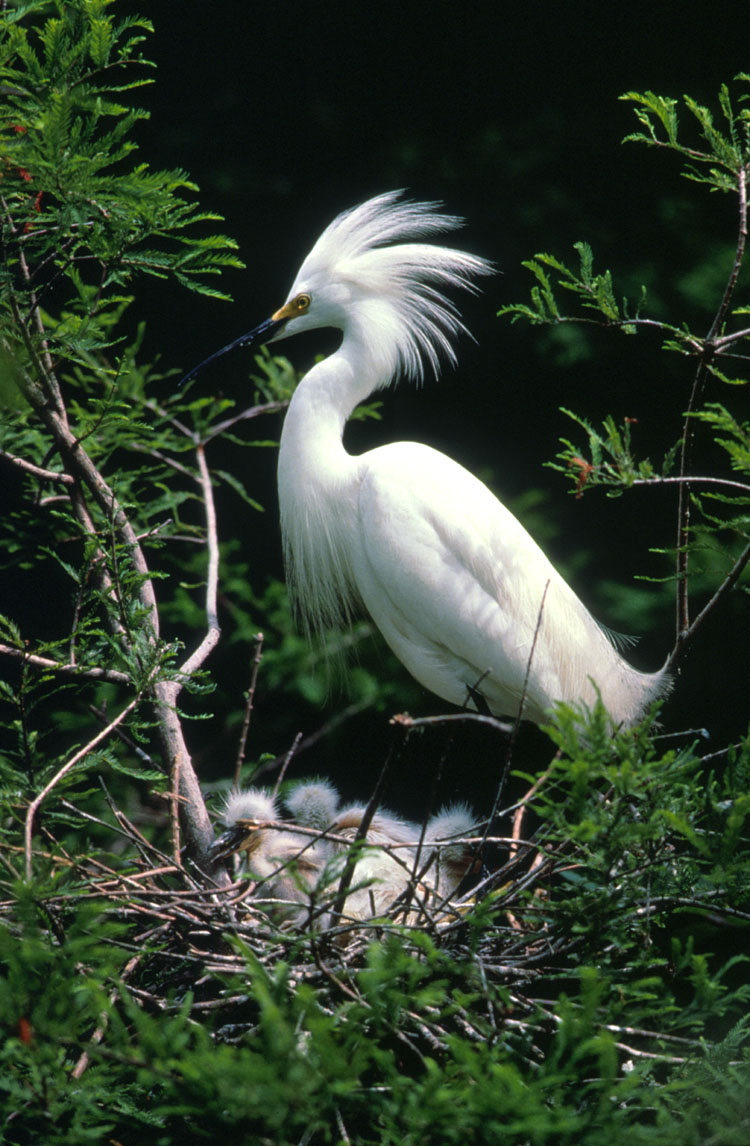
Snowy egret

Order: Pelecaniformes Family: Ardeidae

The family Ardeidae contains the herons, egrets, and bitterns. Herons and egrets are medium to large wading birds with long necks and legs. Bitterns tend to be shorter necked and more secretive. Members of Ardeidae fly with their necks retracted, unlike other long-necked birds such as storks, ibises, and spoonbills.

- American bittern, Botaurus lentiginosus LC
- Least bittern, Ixobrychus exilis LC
- Great blue heron, Ardea herodias LC
- Grey heron, Ardea cinerea (A) LC
- Great egret, Ardea alba LC
- Little egret, Egretta garzetta (A) LC
- Western reef-heron, Egretta gularis (A) LC
- Snowy egret, Egretta thula LC
- Little blue heron, Egretta caerulea (A) LC
- Tricolored heron, Egretta tricolor (A) LC
- Reddish egret, Egretta rufescens (A) NT
- Cattle egret, Bubulcus ibis LC
- Green heron, Butorides virescens LC
- Black-crowned night-heron, Nycticorax nycticorax LC
- Yellow-crowned night-heron, Nyctanassa violacea (A) LC

== Ibises and spoonbills ==
Order: Pelecaniformes Family: Threskiornithidae

Members of this family have long, broad wings, are strong fliers and, rather surprisingly, given their size and weight, very capable soarers. The body tends to be elongated, the neck more so, with rather long legs. The bill is also long, decurved in the case of the ibises, straight and distinctively flattened in the spoonbills.

- White ibis, Eudocimus albus (A) LC
- Glossy ibis, Plegadis falcinellus LC
- White-faced ibis, Plegadis chihi LC
- Roseate spoonbill, Ajaia ajaja (A) LC

== New World vultures ==
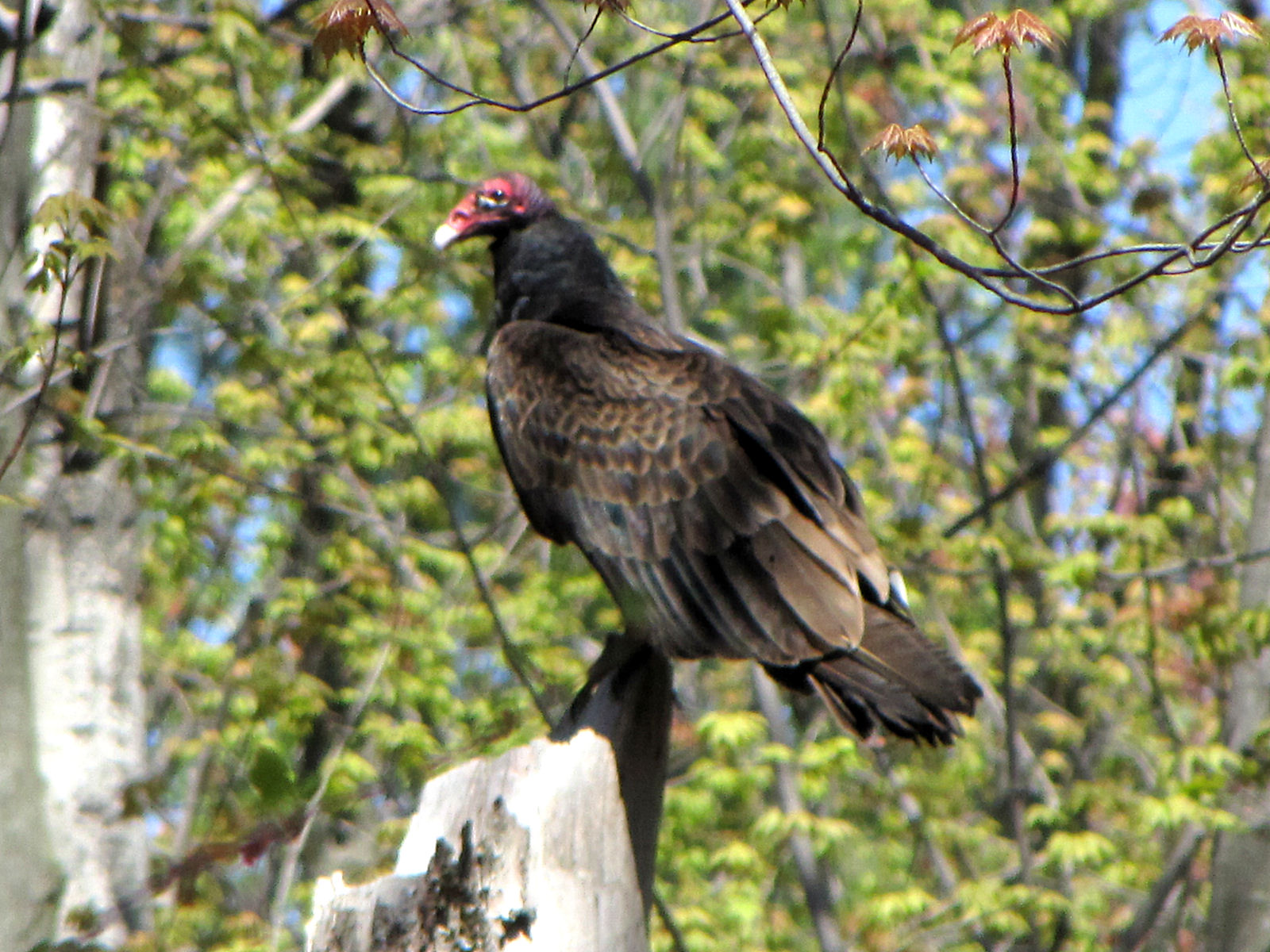
Turkey vulture

Order: Cathartiformes Family: Cathartidae

The New World vultures are not closely related to Old World vultures, but superficially resemble them because of convergent evolution. Like the Old World vultures, they are scavengers. However, unlike Old World vultures, which find carcasses by sight, New World vultures have a good sense of smell with which they locate carcasses.

- California condor, Gymnogyps californianus (Ex) CR
- Black vulture, Coragyps atratus (A) LC
- Turkey vulture, Cathartes aura LC

== Osprey ==
Order: Accipitriformes Family: Pandionidae

Pandionidae is a family of fish-eating birds of prey possessing a very large, powerful hooked beak for tearing flesh from their prey, strong legs, powerful talons, and keen eyesight. The family is monotypic.

- Osprey, Pandion haliaetus LC

== Hawks, eagles, and kites ==
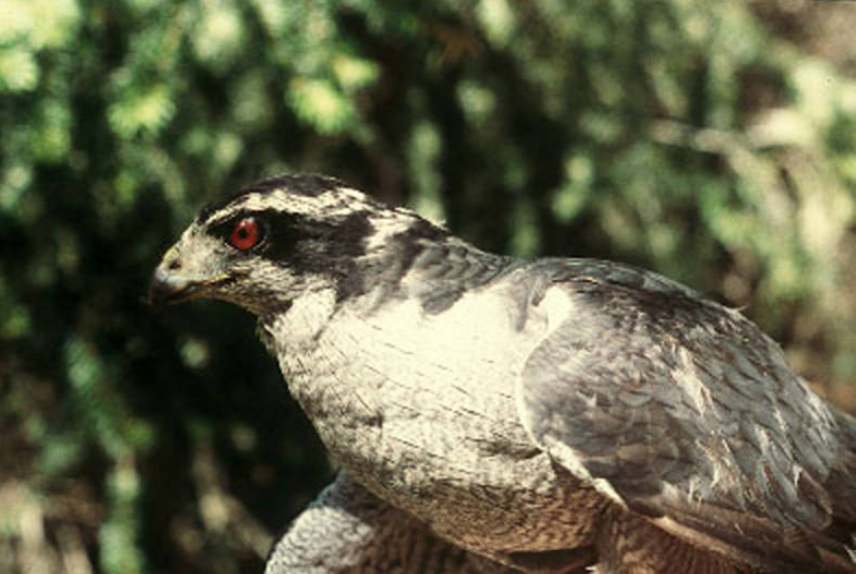
American goshawk

Order: Accipitriformes Family: Accipitridae

Accipitridae is a family of birds of prey, which includes hawks, eagles, kites, harriers and Old World vultures. These birds have very large powerful hooked beaks for tearing flesh from their prey, strong legs, powerful talons, and keen eyesight.

- White-tailed kite, Elanus leucurus (A) LC
- Swallow-tailed kite, Elanoides forficatus (A) LC
- Golden eagle, Aquila chrysaetos LC
- Northern harrier, Circus hudsonius (Not yet assessed by the IUCN)
- Sharp-shinned hawk, Accipiter striatus LC
- Cooper's hawk, Accipiter cooperii LC
- Eurasian goshawk, Accipiter gentilis (A) LC
- American goshawk, Accipiter atricapillus LC
- Bald eagle, Haliaeetus leucocephalus LC
- Steller's sea-eagle, Haliaeetus pelagicus (A) VU
- Mississippi kite, Ictinia mississippiensis (A) LC
- Red-shouldered hawk, Buteo lineatus LC
- Broad-winged hawk, Buteo platypterus LC
- Swainson's hawk, Buteo swainsoni LC
- Zone-tailed hawk, Buteo albonotatus (A) LC
- Red-tailed hawk, Buteo jamaicensis LC
- Rough-legged hawk, Buteo lagopus LC
- Ferruginous hawk, Buteo regalis LC

== Barn owls ==
Order: Strigiformes Family: Tytonidae

Barn owls are medium to large owls with large heads and characteristic heart-shaped faces. They have long, strong legs with powerful talons.

- American barn owl, Tyto furcata LC

== Owls ==
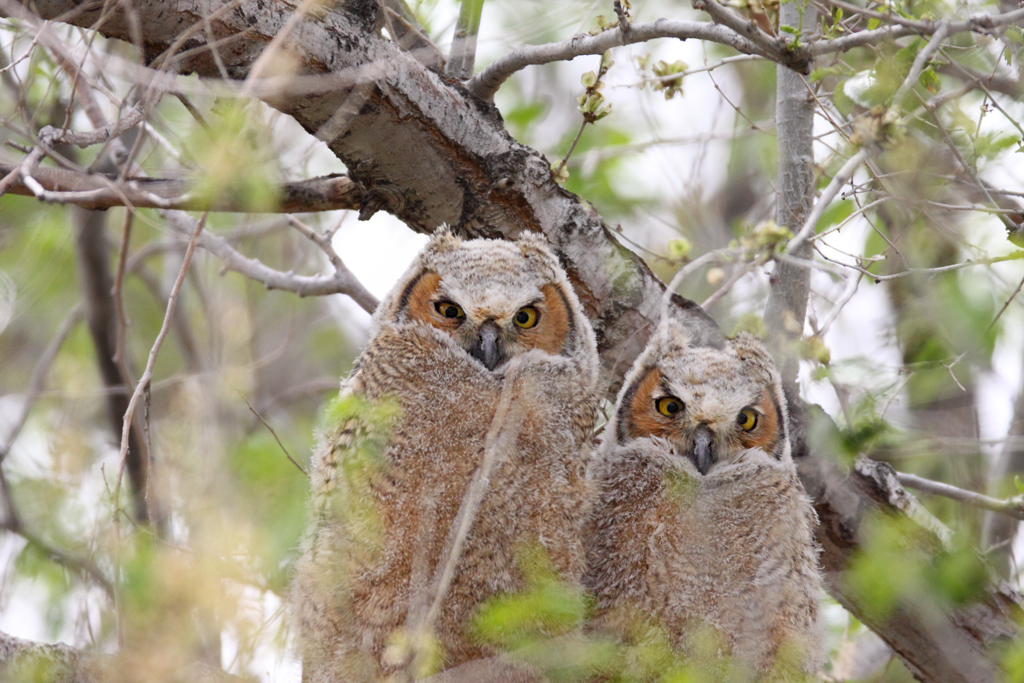
Juvenile great horned owls

Order: Strigiformes Family: Strigidae

Typical owls are small to large solitary nocturnal birds of prey. They have large forward-facing eyes and ears, a hawk-like beak, and a conspicuous circle of feathers around each eye called a facial disk.

- Flammulated owl, Psiloscops flammeolus LC
- Western screech-owl, Megascops kennicottii LC
- Eastern screech-owl, Megascops asio LC
- Great horned owl, Bubo virginianus LC
- Snowy owl, Bubo scandiacus VU
- Northern hawk owl, Surnia ulula LC
- Northern pygmy-owl, Glaucidium gnoma LC
- Burrowing owl, Athene cunicularia LC
- Spotted owl, Strix occidentalis NT
- Barred owl, Strix varia LC
- Great grey owl, Strix nebulosa LC
- Long-eared owl, Asio otus LC
- Short-eared owl, Asio flammeus LC
- Boreal owl, Aegolius funereus LC
- Northern saw-whet owl, Aegolius acadicus LC

== Kingfishers ==
Order: Coraciiformes Family: Alcedinidae

Kingfishers are medium-sized birds with large heads, long, pointed bills, short legs, and stubby tails.

- Belted kingfisher, Megaceryle alcyon LC

== Woodpeckers ==
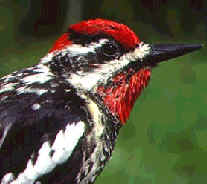
Red-naped sapsucker

Order: Piciformes Family: Picidae

Woodpeckers are small to medium-sized birds with chisel-like beaks, short legs, stiff tails, and long tongues used for capturing insects. Some species have feet with two toes pointing forward and two backward, while several species have only three toes. Many woodpeckers have the habit of tapping noisily on tree trunks with their beaks.

- Lewis's woodpecker, Melanerpes lewis LC
- Red-headed woodpecker, Melanerpes erythrocephalus LC
- Acorn woodpecker, Melanerpes formicivorus (A) LC
- Red-bellied woodpecker, Melanerpes carolinus LC
- Williamson's sapsucker, Sphyrapicus thyroideus LC
- Yellow-bellied sapsucker, Sphyrapicus varius LC
- Red-naped sapsucker, Sphyrapicus nuchalis LC
- Red-breasted sapsucker, Sphyrapicus ruber LC
- American three-toed woodpecker, Picoides dorsalis LC
- Black-backed woodpecker, Picoides arcticus LC
- Downy woodpecker, Dryobates pubescens LC
- Hairy woodpecker, Dryobates villosus LC
- White-headed woodpecker, Dryobates albolarvatus LC
- Northern flicker, Colaptes auratus LC
- Pileated woodpecker, Dryocopus pileatus LC

== Falcons and caracaras ==
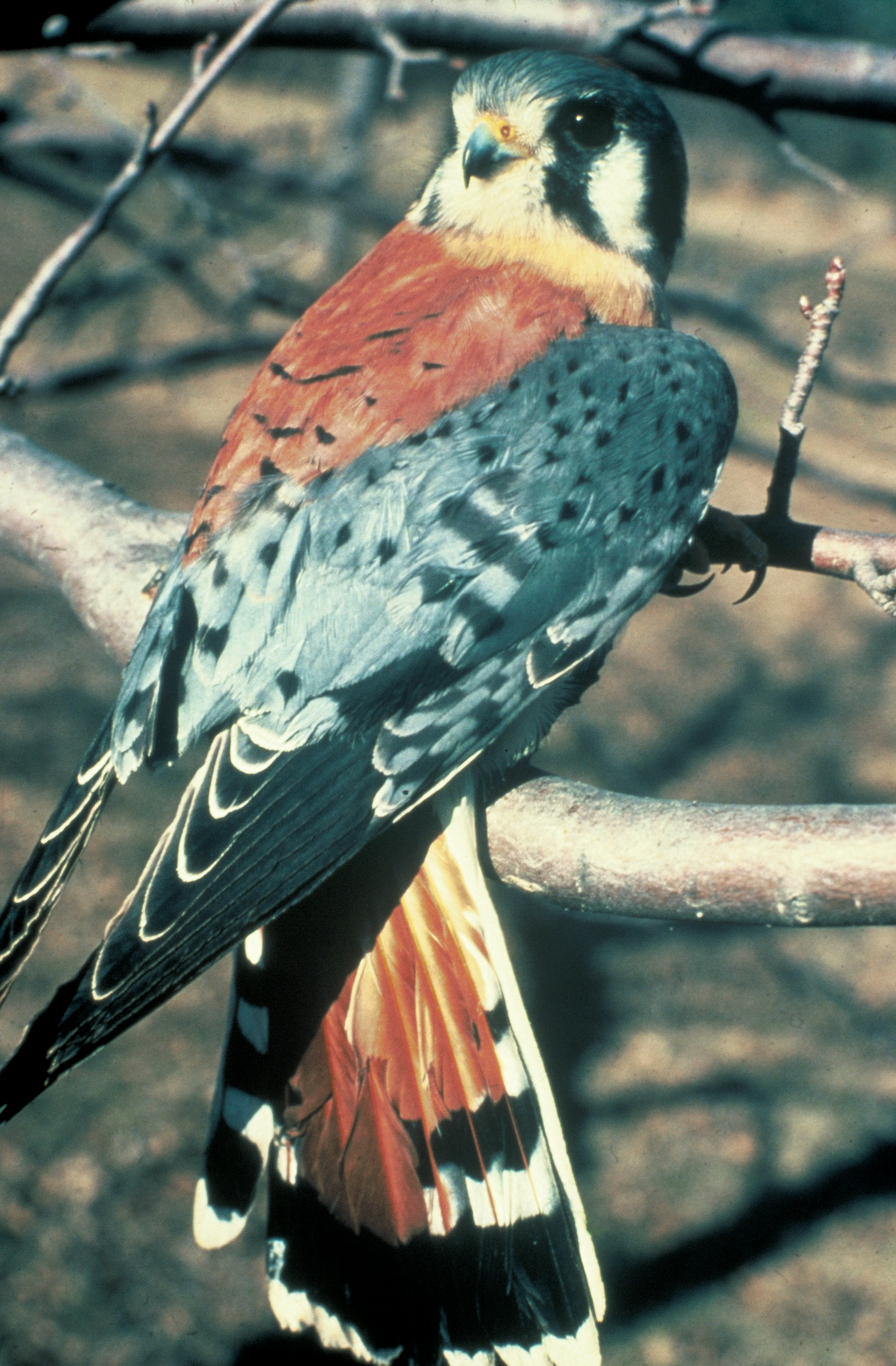
American kestrel

Order: Falconiformes Family: Falconidae

Falconidae is a family of diurnal birds of prey, notably the falcons and caracaras. They differ from hawks, eagles, and kites in that they kill with their beaks instead of their talons.

- Crested caracara, Caracara plancus (A) LC
- Eurasian kestrel, Falco tinnunculus (A) LC
- American kestrel, Falco sparverius LC
- Merlin, Falco columbarius LC
- Gyrfalcon, Falco rusticolus LC
- Peregrine falcon, Falco peregrinus LC
- Prairie falcon, Falco mexicanus LC

== Tyrant flycatchers ==
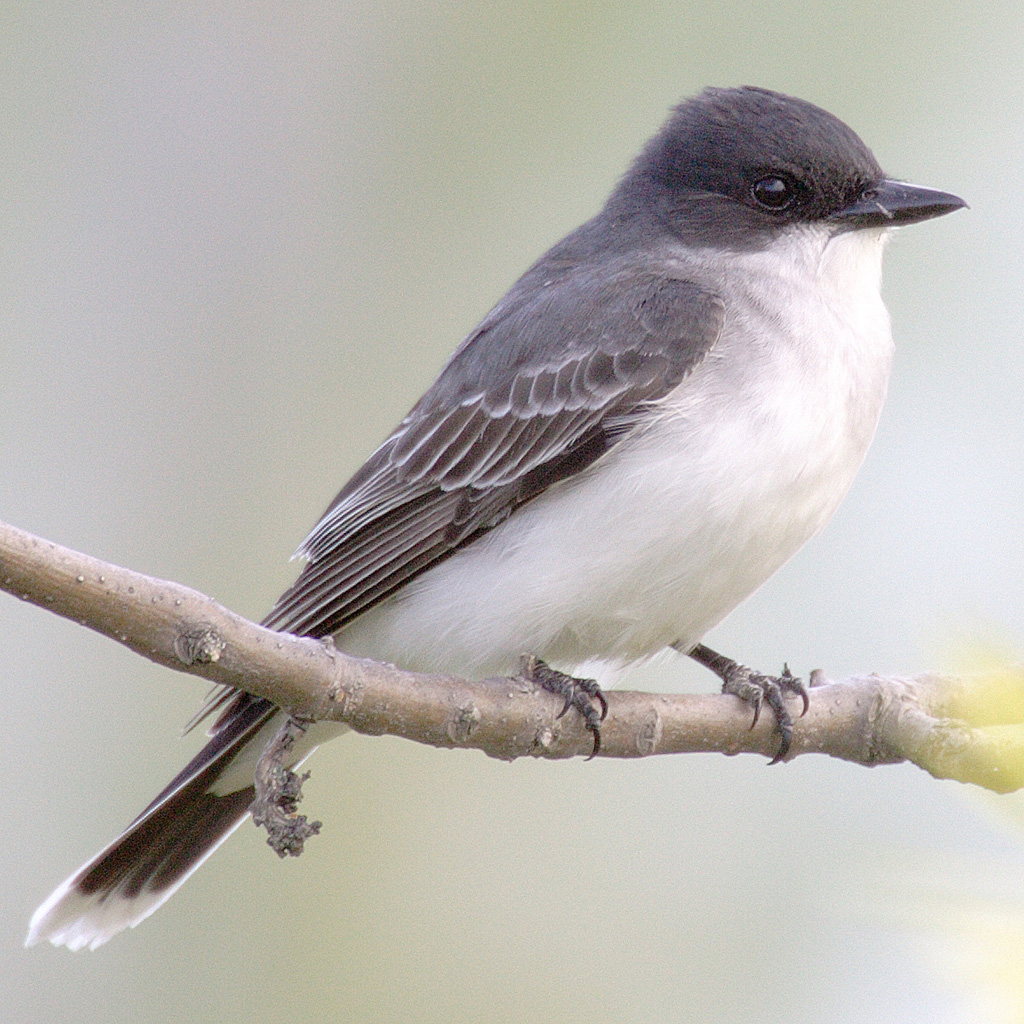
Eastern kingbird

Order: Passeriformes Family: Tyrannidae

Tyrant flycatchers are Passerine birds which occur throughout North and South America. They superficially resemble the Old World flycatchers, but are more robust and have stronger bills. They do not have the sophisticated vocal capabilities of the songbirds. Most, but not all, are rather plain. As the name implies, most are insectivorous.

- Small-billed elaenia, Elaenia parvirostris (A) LC
- Ash-throated flycatcher, Myiarchus cinerascens (A) LC
- Great crested flycatcher, Myiarchus crinitus LC
- Great kiskadee, Pitangus sulphuratus (A) LC
- Sulphur-bellied flycatcher, Myiodynastes luteiventris (A) LC
- Variegated flycatcher, Empidonomus varius (A) LC
- Tropical kingbird, Tyrannus melancholicus (A) LC
- Cassin's kingbird, Tyrannus vociferans (A) LC
- Thick-billed kingbird, Tyrannus crassirostris (A) LC
- Western kingbird, Tyrannus verticalis LC
- Eastern kingbird, Tyrannus tyrannus LC
- Grey kingbird, Tyrannus dominicensis (A) LC
- Scissor-tailed flycatcher, Tyrannus forficatus (A) LC
- Fork-tailed flycatcher, Tyrannus savana (A) LC
- Olive-sided flycatcher, Contopus cooperi NT
- Western wood-pewee, Contopus sordidulus LC
- Eastern wood-pewee, Contopus virens LC
- Yellow-bellied flycatcher, Empidonax flaviventris LC
- Acadian flycatcher, Empidonax virescens LC
- Alder flycatcher, Empidonax alnorum LC
- Willow flycatcher, Empidonax traillii LC
- Least flycatcher, Empidonax minimus LC
- Hammond's flycatcher, Empidonax hammondii LC
- Grey flycatcher, Empidonax wrightii (A) LC
- Dusky flycatcher, Empidonax oberholseri LC
- Pacific-slope flycatcher, Empidonax difficilis LC
- Cordilleran flycatcher, Empidonax occidentalis LC
- Black phoebe, Sayornis nigricans (A) LC
- Eastern phoebe, Sayornis phoebe LC
- Say's phoebe, Sayornis saya LC
- Vermilion flycatcher, Pyrocephalus rubinus (A) LC

== Vireos, shrike-babblers, and erpornis ==
Order: Passeriformes Family: Vireonidae

The vireos are a group of small to medium-sized passerine birds. They are typically greenish in colour and resemble wood warblers, apart from their heavier bills.

- Black-capped vireo, Vireo atricapilla (A) NT
- White-eyed vireo, Vireo griseus LC
- Bell's vireo, Vireo bellii (A) NT
- Hutton's vireo, Vireo huttoni LC
- Yellow-throated vireo, Vireo flavifrons LC
- Cassin's vireo, Vireo cassinii LC
- Blue-headed vireo, Vireo solitarius LC
- Plumbeous vireo, Vireo plumbeus (A) LC
- Philadelphia vireo, Vireo philadelphicus LC
- Warbling vireo, Vireo gilvus LC
- Red-eyed vireo, Vireo olivaceus LC
- Yellow-green vireo, Vireo flavoviridis (A) LC

== Shrikes ==
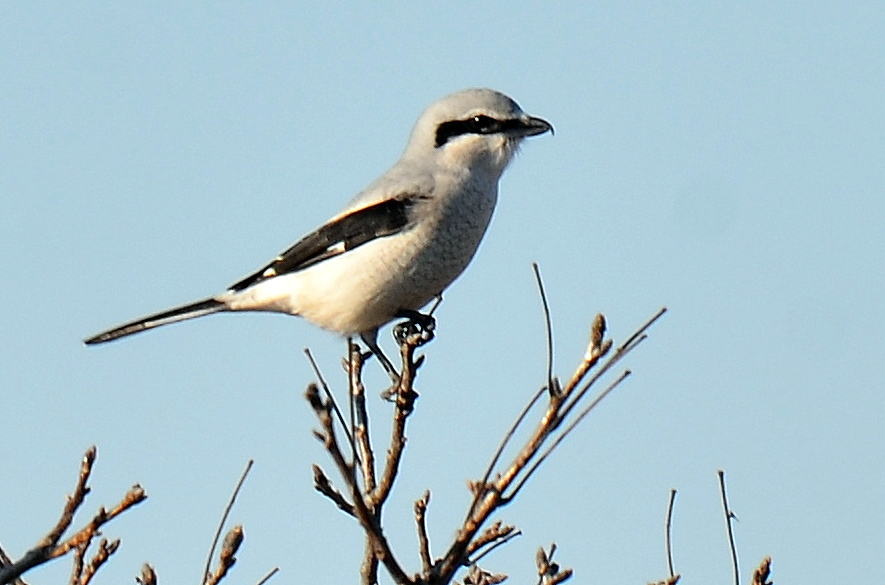
Northern shrike

Order: Passeriformes Family: Laniidae

Shrikes are passerine birds known for their habit of catching other birds and small animals and impaling the uneaten portions of their bodies on thorns. A shrike's beak is hooked, like that of a typical bird of prey.

- Brown shrike, Lanius cristatus (A) LC
- Red-backed shrike, Lanius collurio (A) LC
- Loggerhead shrike, Lanius ludovicianus NT
- Northern shrike, Lanius borealis LC

== Crows, jays, and magpies ==
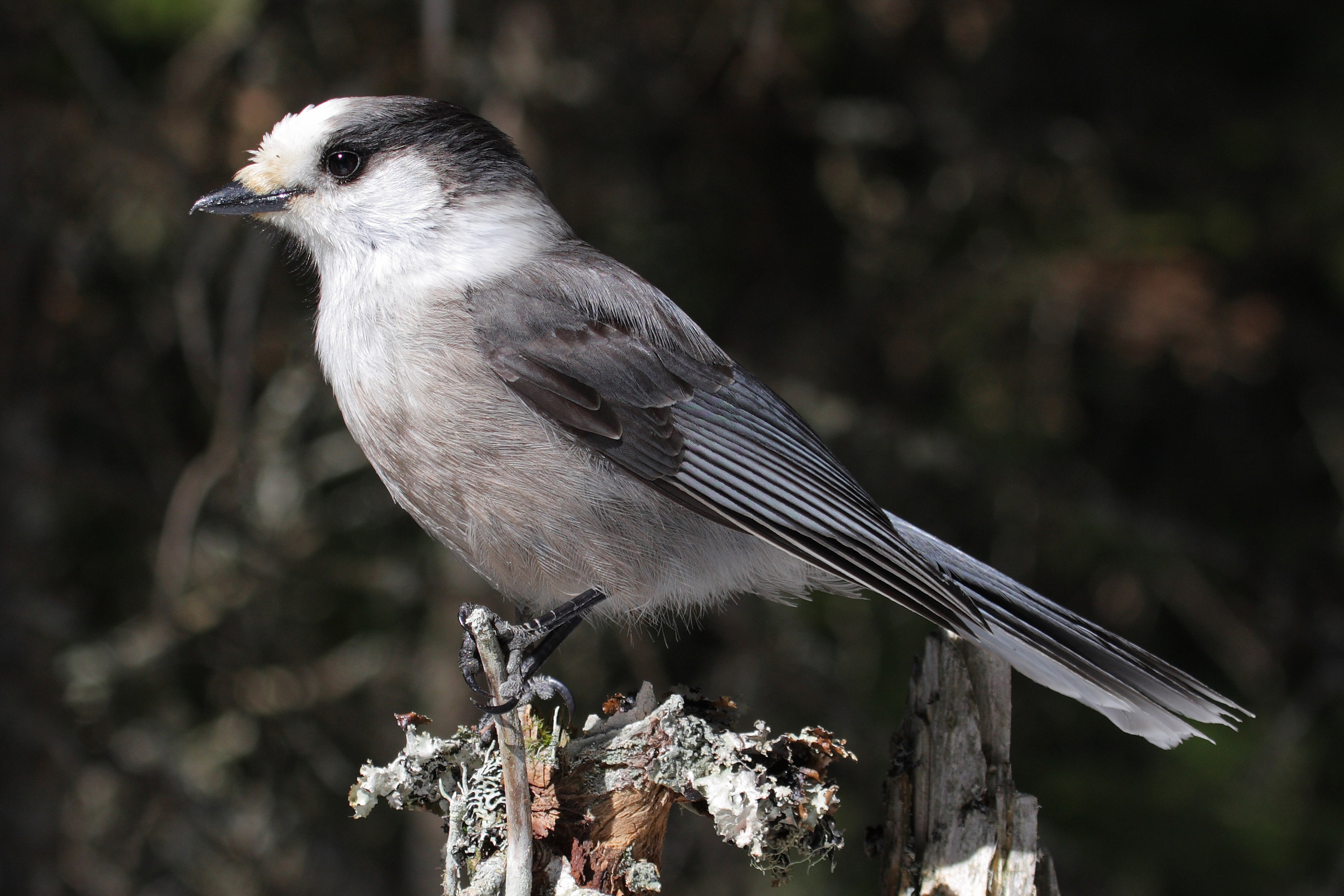
Canada jay

Order: Passeriformes Family: Corvidae

The family Corvidae includes crows, ravens, jays, choughs, magpies, treepies, nutcrackers, and ground jays. Corvids are above average in size among the Passeriformes, and some of the larger species show high levels of intelligence.

- Canada jay, Perisoreus canadensis LC
- Pinyon jay, Gymnorhinus cyanocephalus (A) VU
- Steller's jay, Cyanocitta stelleri LC
- Blue jay, Cyanocitta cristata LC
- California scrub-jay, Aphelocoma californica (A) (Not yet assessed by the IUCN)
- Woodhouse's scrub-jay, Aphelocoma woodhouseii (A) (Not yet assessed by the IUCN)
- Clark's nutcracker, Nucifraga columbiana LC
- Black-billed magpie, Pica hudsonia LC
- Eurasian jackdaw, Corvus monedula (A) LC
- American crow, Corvus brachyrhynchos LC
- Fish crow, Corvus ossifragus (A) LC
- Chihuahuan raven, Corvus cryptoleucus (A) LC
- Common raven, Corvus corax LC

== Tits, chickadees, and titmice ==
Order: Passeriformes Family: Paridae

The Paridae are mainly small stocky woodland species with short stout bills. Some have crests. They are adaptable birds, with a mixed diet including seeds and insects.

- Carolina chickadee, Poecile carolinensis LC
- Black-capped chickadee, Poecile atricapillus LC
- Mountain chickadee, Poecile gambeli LC
- Chestnut-backed chickadee, Poecile rufescens LC
- Boreal chickadee, Poecile hudsonicus LC
- Grey-headed chickadee, Poecile cinctus LC
- Tufted titmouse, Baeolophus bicolor LC

== Larks ==
Order: Passeriformes Family: Alaudidae

Larks are small terrestrial birds with often extravagant songs and display flights. Most larks are fairly dull in appearance. They feed on insects and seeds.

- Eurasian skylark, Alauda arvensis LC
- Horned lark, Eremophila alpestris LC

== Swallows ==
Order: Passeriformes Family: Hirundinidae

The family Hirundinidae is adapted to aerial feeding. They have a slender streamlined body, long pointed wings, and a short bill with a wide gape. The feet are adapted to perching rather than walking, and the front toes are partially joined at the base.

- Bank swallow, Riparia riparia LC
- Tree swallow, Tachycineta bicolor LC
- Violet-green swallow, Tachycineta thalassina LC
- Northern rough-winged swallow, Stelgidopteryx serripennis LC
- Purple martin, Progne subis LC
- Barn swallow, Hirundo rustica LC
- Common house-martin, Delichon urbicum (A) LC
- Cliff swallow, Petrochelidon pyrrhonota LC
- Cave swallow, Petrochelidon fulva LC

== Long-tailed tits ==
Order: Passeriformes Family: Aegithalidae

The long-tailed tits are a family of small passerine birds. Their plumage is typically dull grey or brown in colour. There is only one North American representative of this primarily Palearctic family.

- Bushtit, Psaltriparus minimus LC

== Leaf warblers ==
Order: Passeriformes Family: Phylloscopidae

Leaf warblers are a family of small insectivorous birds found mostly in Eurasia and ranging into Wallacea and Africa. The Arctic warbler breeds east into Alaska. The species are of various sizes, often green-plumaged above and yellow below, or more subdued with greyish-green to greyish-brown colours.

- Yellow-browed warbler, Phylloscopus inornatus (A) LC
- Arctic warbler, Phylloscopus borealis (A) LC
- Kamchatka leaf warbler, Phylloscopus examinandus (A) LC

== Kinglets ==
Order: Passeriformes Family: Regulidae

The kinglets are a small family of birds which resemble the titmice. They are very small, insectivorous birds. The adults have coloured crowns, giving rise to their name.

- Ruby-crowned kinglet, Corthylio calendula LC
- Golden-crowned kinglet, Regulus satrapa LC

== Waxwings ==
Order: Passeriformes Family: Bombycillidae

The waxwings are a group of birds with soft silky plumage and unique red tips to some of the wing feathers. In the Bohemian and cedar waxwings, these tips look like sealing wax and give the group its name. These are arboreal birds of northern forests. They live on insects in the summer and berries in winter.

- Bohemian waxwing, Bombycilla garrulus LC
- Cedar waxwing, Bombycilla cedrorum LC

== Silky-flycatchers ==
Order: Passeriformes Family: Ptiliogonatidae

The silky flycatchers are a small family of passerine birds which occur mainly in Central America. They are related to waxwings and most species have small crests.

- Phainopepla, Phainopepla nitens (A) LC

== Nuthatches ==
Order: Passeriformes Family: Sittidae

Nuthatches are small woodland birds. They have the unusual ability to climb down trees head first, unlike other birds, which can only go upwards. Nuthatches have large heads, short tails, and powerful bills and feet.

- Red-breasted nuthatch, Sitta canadensis LC
- White-breasted nuthatch, Sitta carolinensis LC
- Pygmy nuthatch, Sitta pygmaea LC

== Treecreepers ==
Order: Passeriformes Family: Certhiidae

Treecreepers are small woodland birds, brown above and white below. They have thin, down-pointed, curved bills, which they use to extricate insects from bark. They have stiff tail feathers, like woodpeckers, which they use to support themselves vertically on trees.

- Brown creeper, Certhia americana LC

== Gnatcatchers ==
Order: Passeriformes Family: Polioptilidae

These dainty birds resemble Old World warblers in their structure and habits, moving restlessly through the foliage seeking insects. The gnatcatchers are mainly soft bluish grey in colour and have the typical insectivore's long, sharp bill. Many species have distinctive black head patterns (especially males) and long, regularly cocked, black-and-white tails.

- Blue-grey gnatcatcher, Polioptila caerulea LC

== Wrens ==
Order: Passeriformes Family: Troglodytidae

Wrens are small and inconspicuous birds, except for their loud songs. They have short wings and thin down-turned bills. Several species often hold their tails upright. All are insectivorous.

- Rock wren, Salpinctes obsoletus LC
- Canyon wren, Catherpes mexicanus LC
- House wren, Troglodytes aedon LC
- Pacific wren, Troglodytes pacificus LC
- Winter wren, Troglodytes hiemalis LC
- Sedge wren, Cistothorus platensis LC
- Marsh wren, Cistothorus palustris LC
- Carolina wren, Thryothorus ludovicianus LC
- Bewick's wren, Thryomanes bewickii LC

== Mockingbirds and thrashers ==
Order: Passeriformes Family: Mimidae

The mimids are a family of passerine birds which includes thrashers, mockingbirds, tremblers, and the New World catbirds. These birds are notable for their vocalization, especially their remarkable ability to mimic a wide variety of birds and other sounds heard outdoors. The species tend towards dull greys and browns in their appearance.

- Grey catbird, Dumetella carolinensis LC
- Curve-billed thrasher, Toxostoma curvirostre (A) LC
- Brown thrasher, Toxostoma rufum LC
- Bendire's thrasher, Toxostoma bendirei (A) VU
- Sage thrasher, Oreoscoptes montanus LC
- Northern mockingbird, Mimus polyglottos LC

== Starlings ==
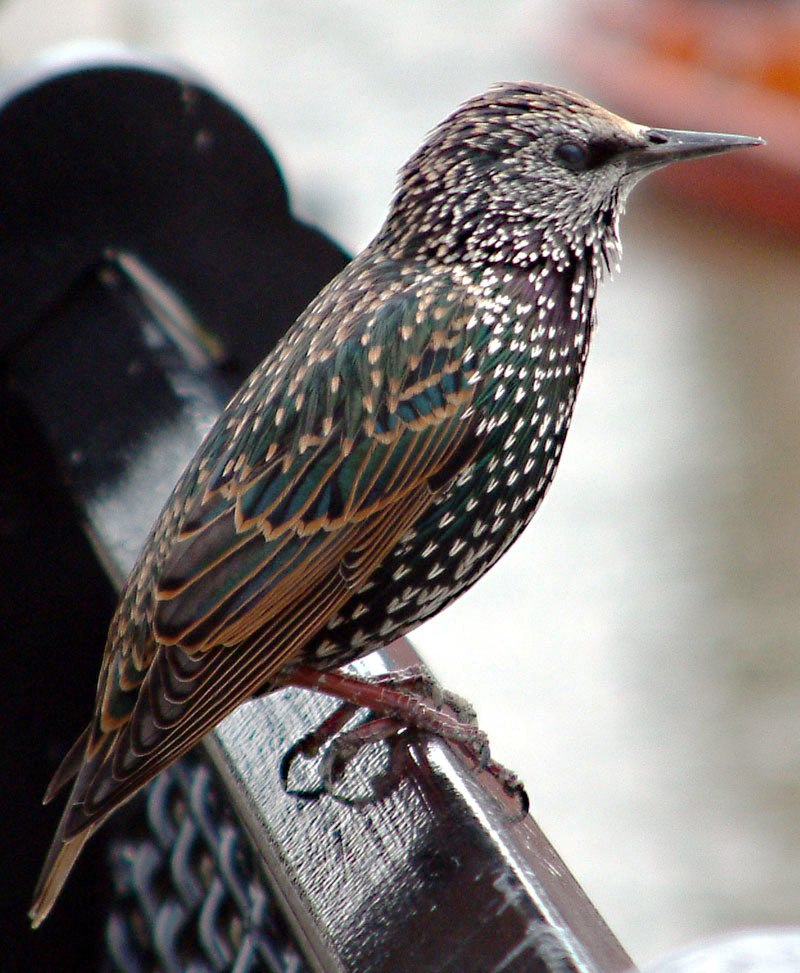
Immature female European starling

Order: Passeriformes Family: Sturnidae

Starlings and mynas are small to medium-sized Old World passerine birds with strong feet. Their flight is strong and direct and most are very gregarious. Their preferred habitat is fairly open country, and they eat insects and fruit. The plumage of several species is dark with a metallic sheen.

- European starling, Sturnus vulgaris (I) LC
- Crested myna, Acridotheres cristatellus (I) (Ex) LC

== Dippers ==
Order: Passeriformes Family: Cinclidae

Dippers are named for their bobbing or dipping movements. They are unique among passerines for their ability to dive and swim underwater.

- American dipper, Cinclus mexicanus LC

== Thrushes and allies ==
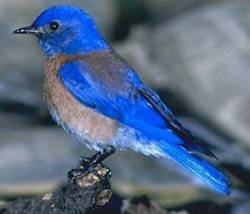
Western bluebird

Order: Passeriformes Family: Turdidae

The thrushes are a group of passerine birds that occur mainly but not exclusively in the Old World. They are plump, soft plumaged, small to medium-sized insectivores or sometimes omnivores, often feeding on the ground. Many have attractive songs.

- Eastern bluebird, Sialia sialis LC
- Western bluebird, Sialia mexicana LC
- Mountain bluebird, Sialia currucoides LC
- Townsend's solitaire, Myadestes townsendi LC
- Veery, Catharus fuscescens LC
- Grey-cheeked thrush, Catharus minimus LC
- Bicknell's thrush, Catharus bicknelli VU
- Swainson's thrush, Catharus ustulatus LC
- Hermit thrush, Catharus guttatus LC
- Wood thrush, Hylocichla mustelina NT
- Mistle thrush, Turdus viscivorus (A) LC
- Eurasian blackbird, Turdus merula (A) LC
- Dusky thrush, Turdus eunomus (A) LC
- Fieldfare, Turdus pilaris (A) LC
- Redwing, Turdus iliacus (A) NT
- Song thrush, Turdus philomelos (A) LC
- American robin, Turdus migratorius LC
- Varied thrush, Ixoreus naevius LC

== Old World flycatchers ==
Order: Passeriformes Family: Muscicapidae

This a large family of small passerine birds restricted to the Old World. Species below only occurs in Canada as vagrants. The appearance of these birds is highly varied, but they mostly have weak songs and harsh calls.

- Siberian rubythroat, Luscinia calliope (A) LC
- Bluethroat, Luscinia svecica LC
- Siberian blue robin, Luscinia cyane (A) LC
- Red-flanked bluetail, Tarsiger cyanurus (A) LC
- Blue rock-thrush, Monticola solitarius (A) LC
- Siberian stonechat, Saxicola maurus (A)
- Northern wheatear, Oenanthe oenanthe LC

== Accentors ==
Order: Passeriformes Family: Prunellidae

Accentors are small, fairly drab species superficially similar, but unrelated to, sparrows. However, accentors have thin sharp bills, reflecting their diet of insects in summer, augmented with seeds and berries in winter.

- Siberian accentor, Prunella montanella (A) LC

== Old World sparrows ==
Order: Passeriformes Family: Passeridae

Old World sparrows are small passerine birds. In general, sparrows tend to be small plump brownish or greyish birds with short tails and short powerful beaks. Sparrows are seed eaters, but they also consume small insects.

- House sparrow, Passer domesticus (I) LC
- Eurasian tree sparrow, Passer montanus (I) (A) LC

== Wagtails and pipits ==
Order: Passeriformes Family: Motacillidae

Motacillidae is a family of small passerine birds with medium to long tails. They include the wagtails, longclaws, and pipits. They are slender ground-feeding insectivores of open country.

- Eastern yellow wagtail, Motacilla tschutschensis LC
- Citrine wagtail, Motacilla citreola (A) LC
- Grey wagtail, Motacilla cinerea (A) LC
- White wagtail, Motacilla alba (A) LC
- Red-throated pipit, Anthus cervinus (A) LC
- American pipit, Anthus rubescens LC
- Sprague's pipit, Anthus spragueii VU

== Finches, euphonias, and allies ==
Order: Passeriformes Family: Fringillidae

Finches are seed-eating passerine birds that are small to moderately large and have a strong beak, usually conical and in some species very large. All have twelve tail feathers and nine primaries. These birds have a bouncing flight with alternating bouts of flapping and gliding on closed wings, and most sing well.

- Common chaffinch, Fringilla coelebs (A) LC
- Brambling, Fringilla montifringilla (A) LC
- Evening grosbeak, Coccothraustes vespertinus VU
- Hawfinch, Coccothraustes coccothraustes (A) LC
- Pine grosbeak, Pinicola enucleator LC
- Grey-crowned rosy-finch, Leucosticte tephrocotis LC
- House finch, Haemorhous mexicanus (Note: House finch is native to the southwestern U.S. Its range has expanded northward from there naturally. It was introduced to Long Island, New York, in 1939 and has expanded in all directions from there.) LC
- Purple finch, Haemorhous purpureus LC
- Cassin's finch, Haemorhous cassinii LC
- Common redpoll, Acanthis flammea LC
- Hoary redpoll, Acanthis hornemanni (Not yet assessed by the IUCN)
- Red crossbill, Loxia curvirostra LC
- White-winged crossbill, Loxia leucoptera LC
- Pine siskin, Spinus pinus LC
- Lesser goldfinch, Spinus psaltria (A) LC
- American goldfinch, Spinus tristis LC
- Oriental greenfinch, Chloris sinica (A) LC

== Longspurs and snow buntings ==
Order: Passeriformes Family: Calcariidae

The Calcariidae are a group of passerine birds which had been traditionally grouped with the New World sparrows, but differ in a number of respects and are usually found in open grassy areas.

- Lapland longspur, Calcarius lapponicus LC
- Chestnut-collared longspur, Calcarius ornatus NT
- Smith's longspur, Calcarius pictus LC
- Thick-billed longspur, Rhynchophanes mccownii LC
- Snow bunting, Plectrophenax nivalis LC
- McKay's bunting, Plectrophenax hyperboreus (A) LC

== Old World buntings ==
Order: Passeriformes Family: Emberizidae

Emberizidae is a family of passerine birds containing a single genus. Until 2017, the New World sparrows (Passerellidae) were also considered part of this family.

- Pine bunting, Emberiza leucocephalos (A) LC
- Little bunting, Emberiza pusilla (A) LC
- Rustic bunting, Emberiza rustica (A) LC
- Yellow-breasted bunting, Emberiza aureola (A) CR

== New World sparrows ==
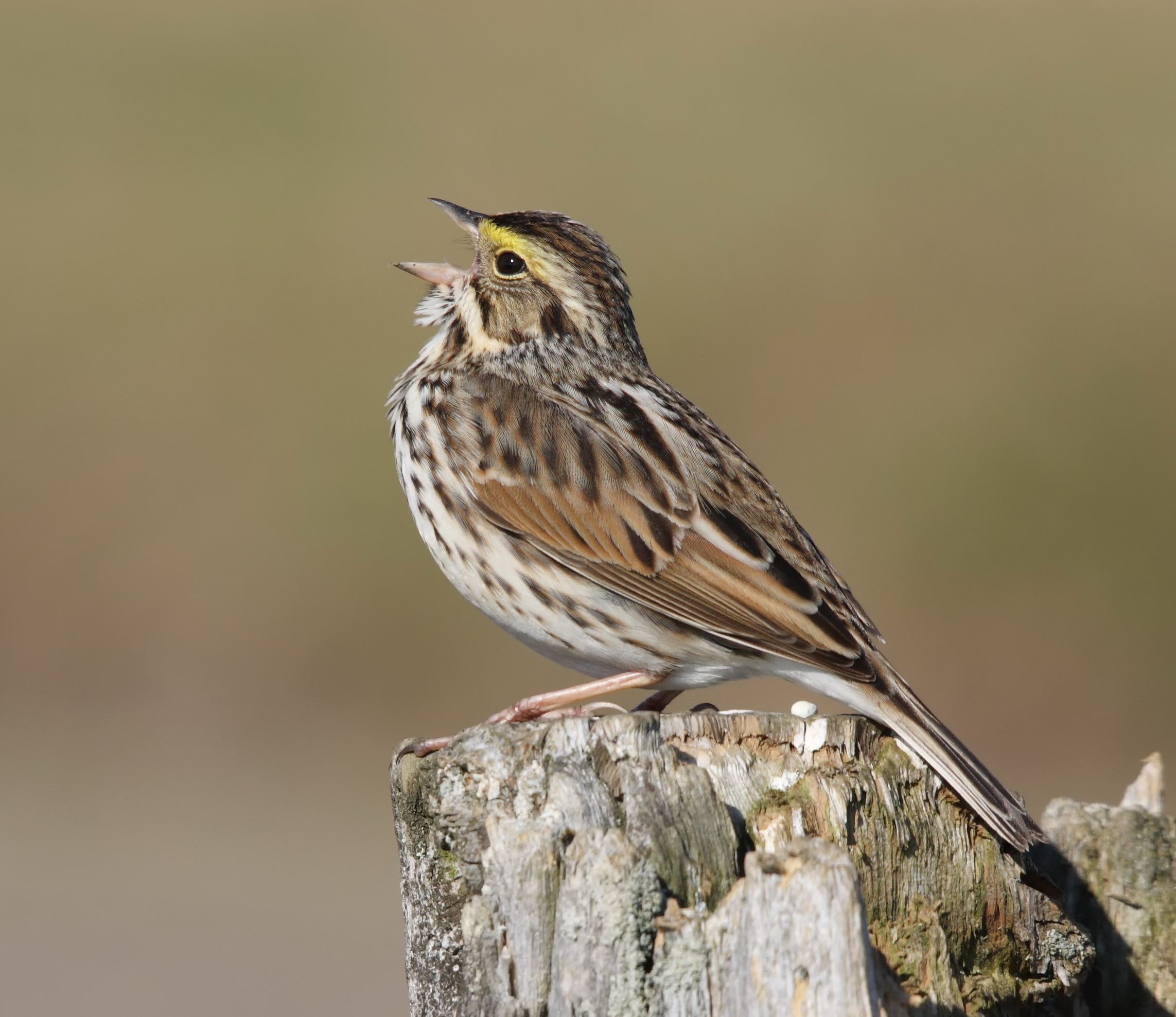
Savannah sparrow

Order: Passeriformes Family: Passerellidae

Until 2017, these species were considered part of the family Emberizidae. Most of the species are known as sparrows, but these birds are not closely related to the Old World sparrows which are in the family Passeridae. Many of these have distinctive head patterns.

- Cassin's sparrow, Peucaea cassinii (A) LC
- Bachman's sparrow, Peucaea aestivalis (A) NT
- Grasshopper sparrow, Ammodramus savannarum LC
- Black-throated sparrow, Amphispiza bilineata (A) LC
- Lark sparrow, Chondestes grammacus LC
- Lark bunting, Calamospiza melanocorys LC
- Chipping sparrow, Spizella passerina LC
- Clay-coloured sparrow, Spizella pallida LC
- Field sparrow, Spizella pusilla LC
- Brewer's sparrow, Spizella breweri LC
- Fox sparrow, Passerella iliaca LC
- American tree sparrow, Spizelloides arborea LC
- Dark-eyed junco, Junco hyemalis LC
- White-crowned sparrow, Zonotrichia leucophrys LC
- Golden-crowned sparrow, Zonotrichia atricapilla LC
- Harris's sparrow, Zonotrichia querula NT
- White-throated sparrow, Zonotrichia albicollis LC
- Sagebrush sparrow, Artemisiospiza nevadensis (A) LC
- Bell's sparrow, Artemisiospiza belli (A) LC
- Vesper sparrow, Pooecetes gramineus LC
- LeConte's sparrow, Ammospiza leconteii LC
- Seaside sparrow, Ammospiza maritima (A) LC
- Nelson's sparrow, Ammospiza nelsoni LC
- Saltmarsh sparrow, Ammospiza caudacuta (A) EN
- Baird's sparrow, Centronyx bairdii LC
- Henslow's sparrow, Centronyx henslowii NT
- Savannah sparrow, Passerculus sandwichensis LC
- Song sparrow, Melospiza melodia LC
- Lincoln's sparrow, Melospiza lincolnii LC
- Swamp sparrow, Melospiza georgiana LC
- Green-tailed towhee, Pipilo chlorurus (A) LC
- Spotted towhee, Pipilo maculatus LC
- Eastern towhee, Pipilo erythrophthalmus LC

== Yellow-breasted chat ==
Order: Passeriformes Family: Icteriidae

This species was historically placed in the wood-warblers (Parulidae) but nonetheless most authorities were unsure if it belonged there. It was placed in its own family in 2017.

- Yellow-breasted chat, Icteria virens

== Troupials and allies ==
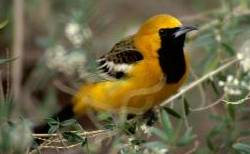
Hooded oriole

Order: Passeriformes Family: Icteridae

The icterids are a group of small to medium-sized, often colourful passerine birds restricted to the New World and include the grackles, New World blackbirds, and New World orioles. Most species have black as a predominant plumage colour, often enlivened by yellow, orange, or red.

- Yellow-headed blackbird, Xanthocephalus xanthocephalus LC
- Bobolink, Dolichonyx oryzivorus LC
- Eastern meadowlark, Sturnella magna NT
- Western meadowlark, Sturnella neglecta LC
- Orchard oriole, Icterus spurius LC
- Hooded oriole, Icterus cucullatus (A) LC
- Bullock's oriole, Icterus bullockii LC
- Baltimore oriole, Icterus galbula LC
- Scott's oriole, Icterus parisorum (A) LC
- Red-winged blackbird, Agelaius phoeniceus LC
- Shiny cowbird, Molothrus bonariensis (A) LC
- Bronzed cowbird, Molothrus aeneus (A) LC
- Brown-headed cowbird, Molothrus ater LC
- Rusty blackbird, Euphagus carolinus VU
- Brewer's blackbird, Euphagus cyanocephalus LC
- Common grackle, Quiscalus quiscula NT
- Great-tailed grackle, Quiscalus mexicanus (A) LC

== New World warblers ==
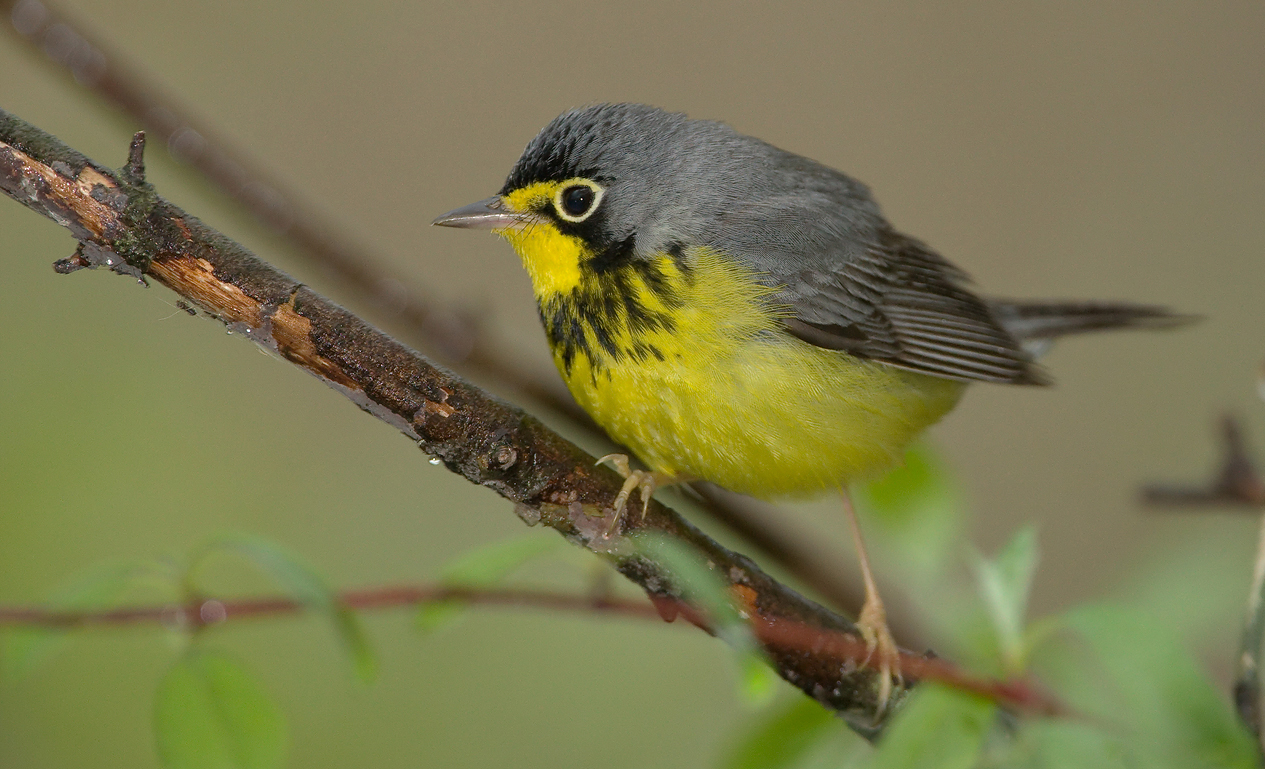
Canada warbler

Order: Passeriformes Family: Parulidae

The wood warblers are a group of small, often colourful passerine birds restricted to the New World. Most are arboreal, but some are more terrestrial. Most members of this family are insectivores.

- Ovenbird, Seiurus aurocapilla LC
- Worm-eating warbler, Helmitheros vermivorus (A) LC
- Louisiana waterthrush, Parkesia motacilla LC
- Northern waterthrush, Parkesia noveboracensis LC
- Golden-winged warbler, Vermivora chrysoptera NT
- Blue-winged warbler, Vermivora cyanoptera LC
- Black-and-white warbler, Mniotilta varia LC
- Prothonotary warbler, Protonotaria citrea LC
- Swainson's warbler, Limnothlypis swainsonii (A) LC
- Tennessee warbler, Leiothlypis peregrina LC
- Orange-crowned warbler, Leiothlypis celata LC
- Lucy's warbler, Leiothlypis luciae (A) LC
- Nashville warbler, Leiothlypis ruficapilla LC
- Virginia's warbler, Leiothlypis virginiae (A) LC
- Connecticut warbler, Oporornis agilis LC
- MacGillivray's warbler, Geothlypis tolmiei LC
- Mourning warbler, Geothlypis philadelphia LC
- Kentucky warbler, Geothlypis formosa (A) LC
- Common yellowthroat, Geothlypis trichas LC
- Hooded warbler, Setophaga citrina LC
- American redstart, Setophaga ruticilla LC
- Kirtland's warbler, Setophaga kirtlandii (A) NT
- Cape May warbler, Setophaga tigrina LC
- Cerulean warbler, Setophaga cerulea VU
- Northern parula, Setophaga americana LC
- Magnolia warbler, Setophaga magnolia LC
- Bay-breasted warbler, Setophaga castanea LC
- Blackburnian warbler, Setophaga fusca LC
- Yellow warbler, Setophaga aestiva LC
- Chestnut-sided warbler, Setophaga pensylvanica LC
- Blackpoll warbler, Setophaga striata NT
- Black-throated blue warbler, Setophaga caerulescens LC
- Palm warbler, Setophaga palmarum LC
- Pine warbler, Setophaga pinus LC
- Yellow-rumped warbler, Setophaga coronata LC
- Yellow-throated warbler, Setophaga dominica (A) LC
- Prairie warbler, Setophaga discolor LC
- Grace's warbler, Setophaga graciae (A) LC
- Black-throated grey warbler, Setophaga nigrescens LC
- Townsend's warbler, Setophaga townsendi LC
- Hermit warbler, Setophaga occidentalis (A) LC
- Black-throated green warbler, Setophaga virens LC
- Canada warbler, Cardellina canadensis LC
- Wilson's warbler, Cardellina pusilla LC
- Painted redstart, Myioborus pictus (A) LC

== Cardinals and allies ==
Order: Passeriformes Family: Cardinalidae

The cardinals are a family of robust, seed-eating birds with strong bills. They are typically associated with open woodlands. The sexes usually have distinct plumages.

- Hepatic tanager, Piranga flava (A) LC
- Summer tanager, Piranga rubra (A) LC
- Scarlet tanager, Piranga olivacea LC
- Western tanager, Piranga ludoviciana LC
- Northern cardinal, Cardinalis cardinalis LC
- Pyrrhuloxia, Cardinalis sinuatus (A) LC
- Rose-breasted grosbeak, Pheucticus ludovicianus LC
- Black-headed grosbeak, Pheucticus melanocephalus LC
- Blue grosbeak, Passerina caerulea (A) LC
- Lazuli bunting, Passerina amoena LC
- Indigo bunting, Passerina cyanea LC
- Varied bunting, Passerina versicolor (A) NT
- Painted bunting, Passerina ciris (A) NT
- Dickcissel, Spiza americana LC

== See also ==
- List of birds
- Lists of birds by region
- List of North American birds
- List of mammals of Canada
- List of amphibians of Canada
- List of reptiles of Canada
