= Japanese leaf warbler =

Conservation status
- Least Concern (IUCN 3.1)

Scientific classification
- Kingdom: Animalia
- Phylum: Chordata
- Class: Aves
- Order: Passeriformes
- Family: Phylloscopidae
- Genus: Phylloscopus
- Species: P. xanthodryas

Binomial name
- Phylloscopus xanthodryas (R. Swinhoe, 1863)

Synonyms
- Phylloscopus borealis xanthodryas

Species of bird

The Japanese leaf warbler (Phylloscopus xanthodryas) is a leaf warbler (family Phylloscopidae). The species was first described by Robert Swinhoe in 1863. It was formerly included in the "Old World warbler" assemblage. It is closely related to the Arctic warbler and the Kamchatka leaf warbler, to which it was formerly considered conspecific.

It is found throughout Japan, except on Hokkaido; it winters to Southeast Asia.

== Description ==
The Japanese Leaf-Warbler is sized between 12–13 cm in length. They typically have darker green upper body feathers, with an under body (or belly) with lighter green feathers. They have a very short and black (with a hint of yellow) beak, as well as extremely small legs that vary from pale yellow to orange-brown. The bird has a clear yellowish-white eyebrow stripe above the bird's dark eyes. Adults are bright olive-green (with a white wingbar and greenish tail). Both sexes look alike. Juveniles are roughly similar, yet duller in color (more grey-brown).

== Subspecies ==
Monotypic, only existing form of this species of bird and there are no further subdivisions.

== General Habitat ==
This species lives in mixed and deciduous forests, as well as in coniferous woods and thickets. It is usually found between 1500 and 2500 meters in elevation, but most often below 2200 meters. It nests in thick undergrowth, rhododendron bushes, and scrub above the tree line. In winter, it is seen below 1800 meters in woodlands, rainforests, secondary growth, plantations, and gardens. It also occurs in shrublands, wetlands, and cultivated areas, as well as artificial terrestrial habitats. The species depends on thick vegetation for nesting and foraging.

== Distribution ==
The Japanese leaf warbler breeds mainly in Japan, from Honshu to Kyushu. In the non-breeding season, it is found in areas such as Taiwan, the Philippines, Borneo, Java, and in small numbers as far east as the Moluccas. It also winters in Brunei, Indonesia, Malaysia, and parts of China.

=== Movements and Migration ===
The Japanese leaf warbler is a migratory bird. After breeding, it moves south or southwest through eastern China and nearby islands. It spends the winter in Taiwan, the Philippines, Borneo, and Java. Migration takes place from August to November, and the birds return to Japan in mid-May. Arrival often happens within one or two weeks, although timing can be confused with other related species.

== Diet and Foraging ==
Its diet is made up mostly of insects and their larvae. Common food items include midges, ants, grasshoppers, caterpillars, beetles, spiders, and small snails. In autumn, it may also eat berries. The warbler usually forages alone or in pairs but can join mixed groups of birds outside of the breeding season. It searches for food in trees, shrubs, and on the ground, and it sometimes catches insects while flying.

== Sounds and Vocal Behavior ==
The song of the Japanese leaf warbler is a series of short phrases repeated several times, often lasting 1.5–2 seconds. It is lower in pitch than that of related species such as P. examinandus and has a slower rhythm than P. borealis. Its call is a dry “brrt” sound, which is lower and softer compared to the calls of similar warblers.

== Breeding ==
Breeding takes place from June to August, and pairs often raise two broods in a season. The species is mostly monogamous. Males sing to mark their territory, and nests are built on the ground among plants or bamboo. Nests are round and made of moss, stalks, and animal fur, with an opening at the side. The clutch usually contains four to five white eggs with small dark spots. The female incubates the eggs for about 12–13 days, and chicks leave the nest 13–14 days after hatching. Both parents feed the young, though sometimes the female cares for them alone. Nests are often targeted by cuckoos, which lay their eggs inside, and snakes may also prey on them.

== Conservation status ==
The Japanese leaf warbler is currently classified as Least Concern on the IUCN Red List (assessed June 12, 2024). The population trend is considered stable, and there is no evidence of major declines or severe fragmentation. Exact numbers of mature individuals are unknown, but it is locally common, with male territory density estimated at 10–30 birds per square kilometer. Its average generation length is estimated at about 2 years.
