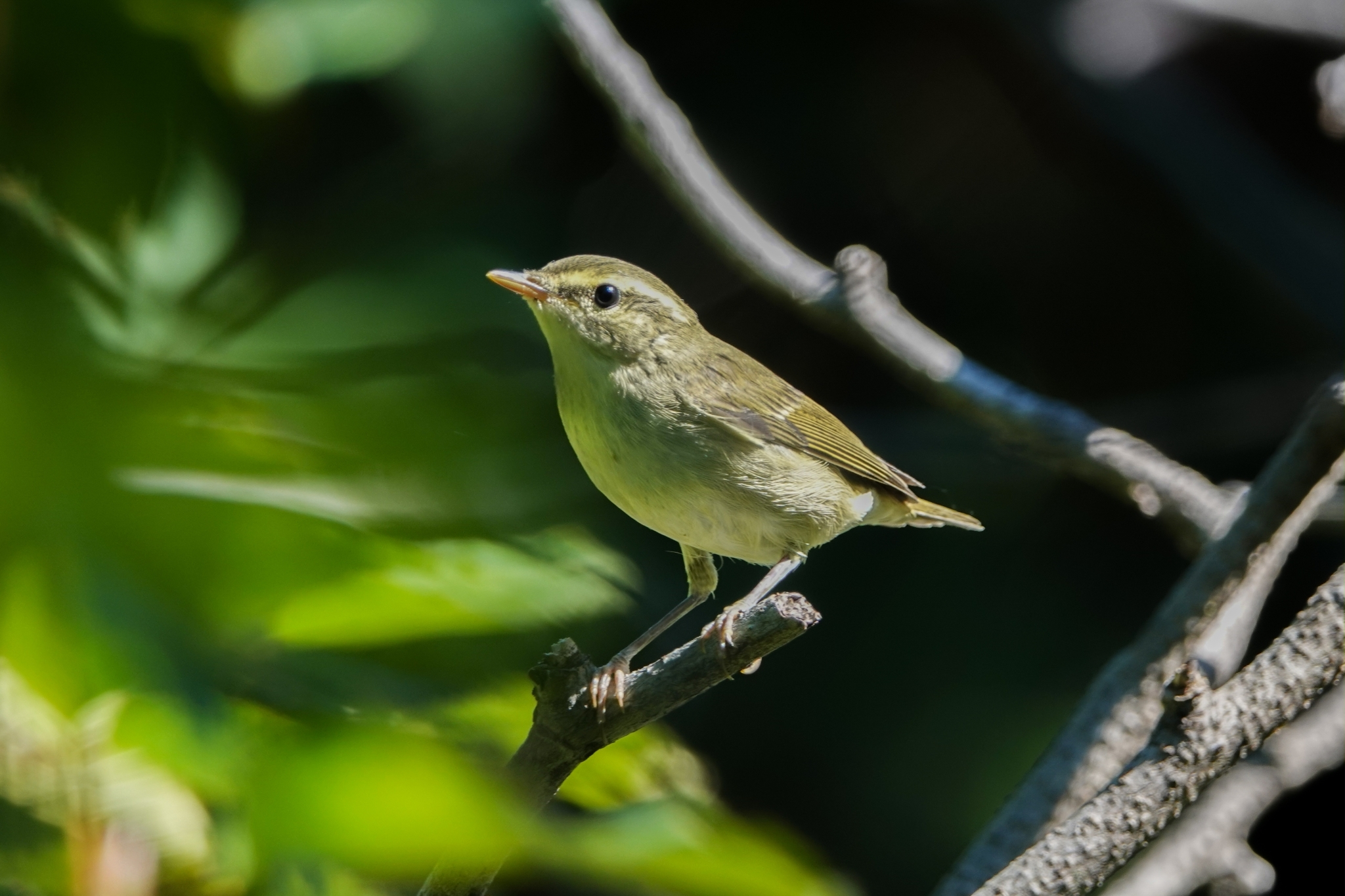

Conservation status
- Least Concern (IUCN 3.1)

Scientific classification
- Kingdom: Animalia
- Phylum: Chordata
- Class: Aves
- Order: Passeriformes
- Family: Phylloscopidae
- Genus: Phylloscopus
- Species: P. examinandus

Binomial name
- Phylloscopus examinandus Stresemann, 1913

Synonyms
- Phylloscopus borealis examinandus

= Kamchatka leaf warbler =

Species of bird

The Kamchatka leaf warbler (Phylloscopus examinandus) is a species of leaf warbler (family Phylloscopidae). It was formerly included in the "Old World warbler" assemblage. It is closely related to the Arctic warbler and the Japanese leaf warbler, to which it was formerly considered conspecific.

It breeds in Kamchatka, Sakhalin, Hokkaido and the Kurile Islands; it migrates to Indonesia and the Philippines.

The first European observation of a Kamchatka leaf warbler was made on July 18, 2021, in Kilpisjärvi, Enontekiö, Finland.
