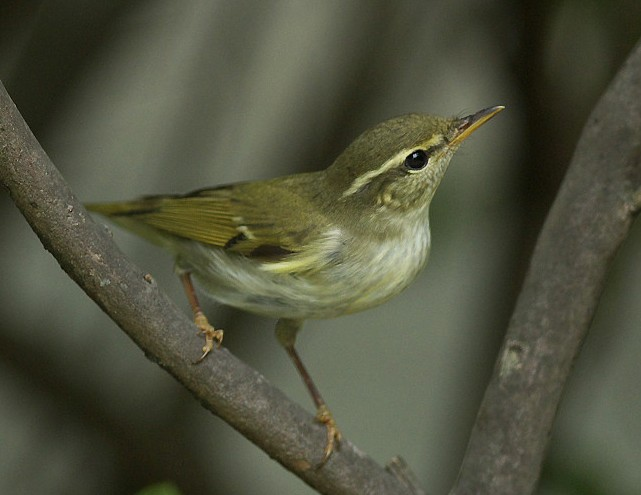
- Taipei

Conservation status
- Least Concern (IUCN 3.1)

Scientific classification
- Kingdom: Animalia
- Phylum: Chordata
- Class: Aves
- Order: Passeriformes
- Family: Phylloscopidae
- Genus: Phylloscopus
- Species: P. borealis

Binomial name
- Phylloscopus borealis (Blasius, JH, 1858)
- Distribution of Arctic warbler Breeding Non-breeding

= Arctic warbler =

Species of migratory leaf warbler

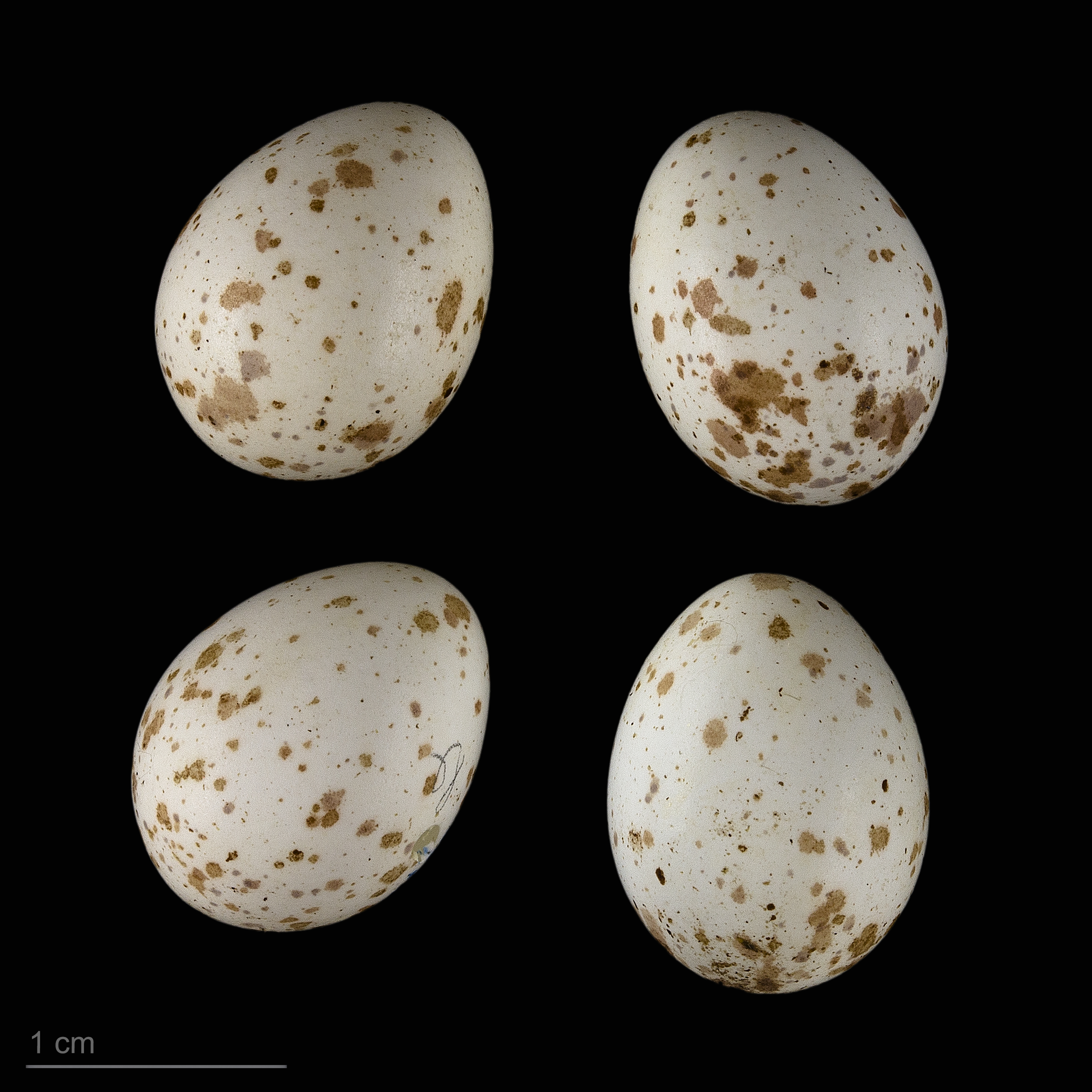
Phylloscopus borealis - MHNT

The Arctic warbler (Phylloscopus borealis) is a widespread leaf warbler in birch or mixed birch forest near water throughout its breeding range in Fennoscandia and the northern Palearctic. It has established a foothold in North America, breeding in Alaska. This warbler is strongly migratory; the entire population winters in southeast Asia. It therefore has one of the longest migrations of any Old World insectivorous bird.

It traditionally included populations that breed in Kamchatka, the Kuril Islands and Japan, but genetic and vocal evidence strongly suggested these should be treated as separate species, and are all now considered distinct with the Kamchatka leaf warbler in Kamchatka, Hokkaido and the Kuril Islands, and the Japanese leaf warbler in Japan (except Hokkaido).

The nest is on the ground in a low shrub. Like most Old World warblers, this small passerine is insectivorous.

This is a typical leaf warbler in appearance, greyish-green above and off-white below. Its single wing bar distinguishes it from most similar species except the greenish warbler, Phylloscopus trochiloides. It is larger than that species and has a heavier, dagger-like bill, with a dark tip to the lower mandible. Its song is a fast trill.

This species occurs as an autumn vagrant in western Europe and is annual on Great Britain. There were 225 confirmed arctic warbler sightings in Britain between 1958 and 2001.

The genus name Phylloscopus is from Ancient Greek phullon, "leaf", and skopos, "seeker" (from skopeo, "to watch"). The specific borealis is from Latin and means "northern".
