= Human milk immunity =

Protection provided to immune system via human milk

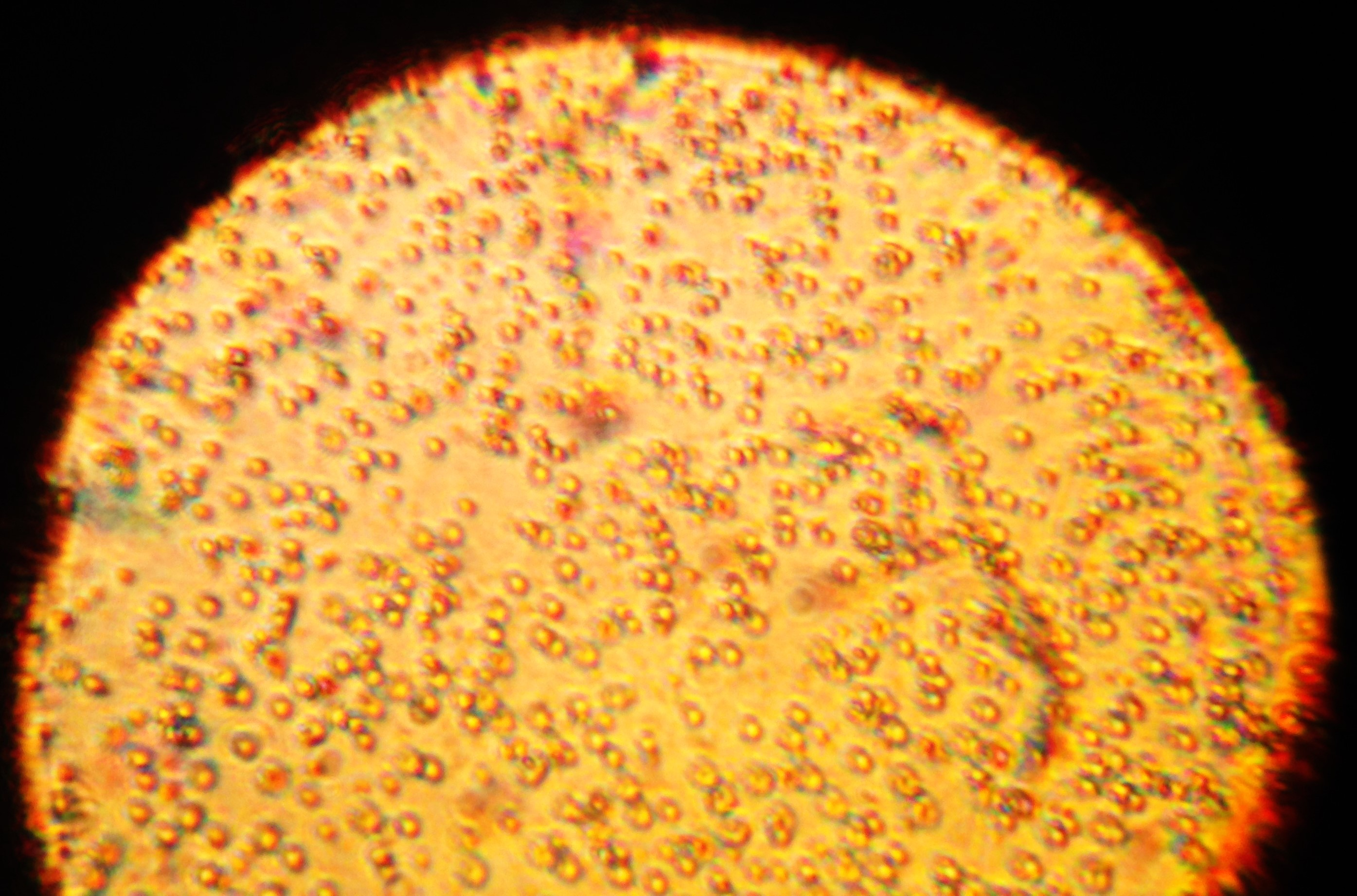
A microscopy image of a sample of human breast milk

Human milk immunity is the protection provided to the immune system of an infant via the biologically active components in human milk. Human milk was previously thought to only provide passive immunity primarily through Secretory IgA, but advances in technology have led to the identification of various immune-modulating components. Human milk constituents provide nutrition and protect the immunologically naive infant as well as regulate the infant's own immune development and growth.

Immune factors and immune-modulating components in human milk include cytokines, growth factors, proteins, microbes, and human milk oligosaccharides. Immune factors in human milk are categorized mainly as anti-inflammatory primarily working without inducing inflammation or activating the complement system.

== Immune factors ==
Bio-active constituents of human milk that have been cataloged to possess immune-modulating capabilities include immunoglobulins, Lactoferrin, Lysozyme, oligosaccharides, lipids, cytokines, hormones, and growth factors. Some of the roles of bio-actives in human milk are theorized based on their function in other parts of the body, but the mechanisms and function of their activities remain to be discovered.

=== IgA ===
Immunoglobulin A is the most well known immune factor in human milk. In its secretory form, SIgA, it is the most plentiful antibody in human milk. It constitutes between 80 and 90% of all immunoglobulins present in milk. SIgA provides adaptive immunity by directly targeting specific pathogens that both the infant and the mother have been exposed to in their environments.

=== Lactoferrin ===
Lactoferrin is an immune protein with strong anti-microbial function in human milk. Lactoferrin protects the infant intestine by binding to iron to prevent pathogens from utilizing it as a resource. It also modulates immunity by blocking inflammatory signaling cytokines.

=== Cytokines ===
Cytokines are pluripotent signaling molecules with the ability to bind to specific receptors. They can cross the intestinal barrier and mediate immune activity. Their presence in human milk may stimulate lymphocytes responsible for the development of the infant's specific immunity. Cytokines present in human milk include IL-1β, IL-6, IL-8, IL-10, TNFα, and IFN-γ.

== Origin and establishment ==
Bio-active components in human milk are speculated to colonize in human milk in several ways including secretion by the mammary gland, epithelium cells, and by milk cells. Maternal immune factors are transferred by lymphocytes traveling from the mother's gut to the mammary gland where the secretory cells of the breast produce antibodies.

The origin of the human milk microbiota, including those with immune-modulating functions, are not well established. However, several theories including skin-to-skin contact, the entero-mammary pathway, and retrograde back-flow hypothesis have been put forth to explain the microbial composition of human milk.

== Known factors of influence ==
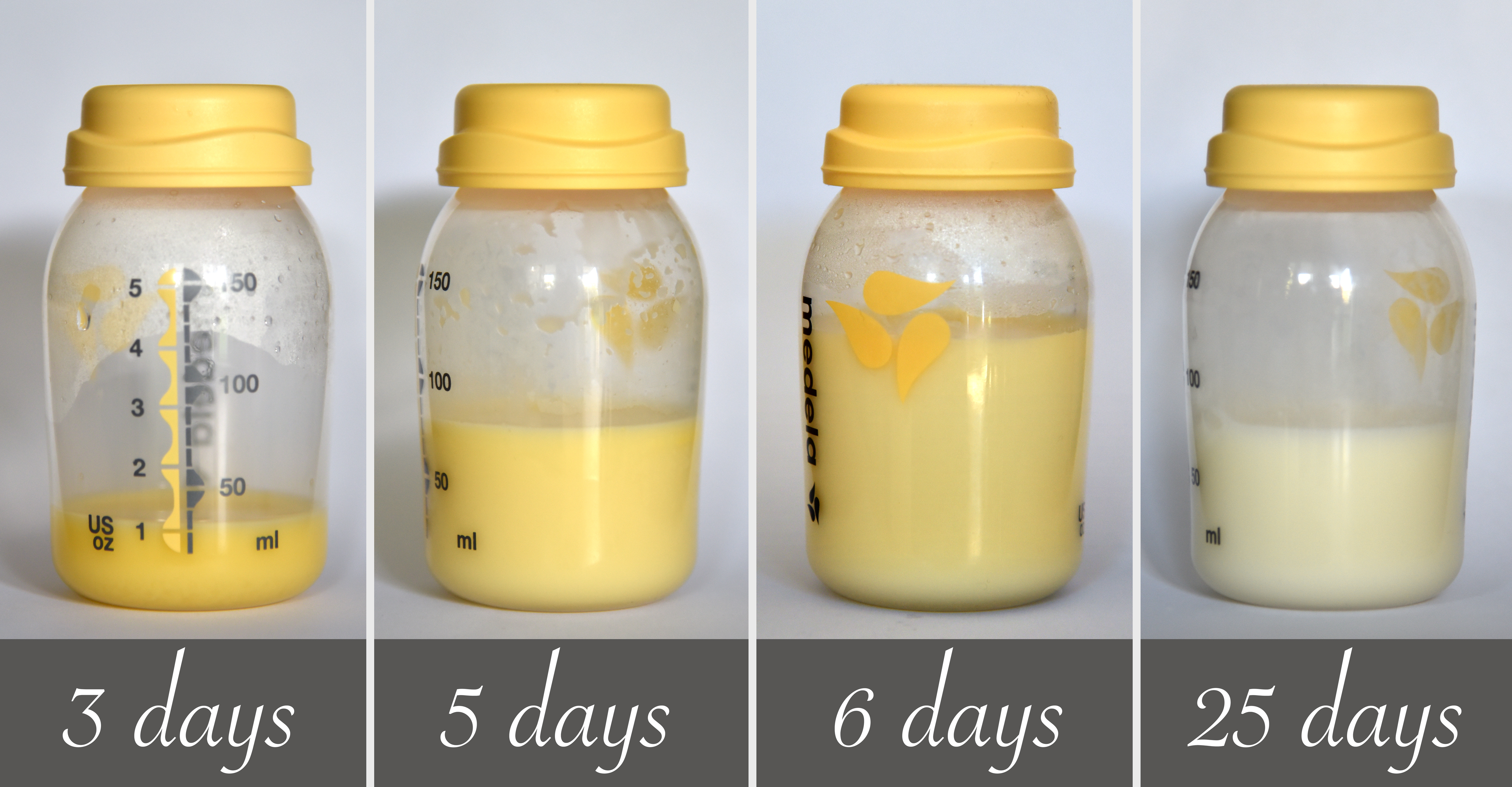
From Colostrum to Breastmilk in days

=== Lactation stage ===
Human milk immune composition is known to change over the course of lactation. Most notably, antibody levels are lower in mature milk than in colostrum, with SIgA measuring at up to 12 grams per liter in colostrum and decreasing to 1 gram per liter in mature milk. Studies find time postpartum to be most influential on the presence of immune factors, including growth factors and lactoferrin.

=== Human milk microbiome ===
The exposure to microbiota through mother's milk is the primary stimulus for immune development in infants. Microbiota interacts with the infant's immune system by stimulating the mucous layer, down-regulating the inflammatory response, producing antibodies and helping initiate oral tolerance. Mucosal layers protection comes from their ability to limit pathogens from attaching to the infant intestinal tract.

=== Human milk oligosaccharides ===
Human milk oligosaccharides (HMOs) are carbohydrate components in human milk. They are mostly indigestible and work as a prebiotic to feed commensal bacteria in the infant gut. Studies show that HMOs also function as immune-modulators by blocking receptors that allow pathogenic bacteria to attach to the infant intestinal epithelium.

=== Delivery mode ===
There are observed differences in immune factor composition in the milk of mothers who delivered cesarean versus vaginally. A study of 82 women saw an increase in the levels of IgA in the colostrum of women who had cesarean births after experiencing labor when compared to women who delivered vaginally or had elected cesareans.

=== Maternal Characteristics ===
==== Parity ====
Milk immunity levels are observably lower in women with higher parity. A study among the Ariaal women of Kenya saw that milk IgA decreased drastically only in women who had given birth to eight or more children.

==== Diet ====
Human milk composition remains relatively stable despite maternal dietary changes, except in cases of extreme maternal depletion. Seasonal changes and malnutrition influence the concentration of immune factors.

In addition, intervention studies have confirmed that both fish oil and fish consumption during pregnancy can alter immune-modulating components in human milk.

=== Environmental factors ===
Differences in the maternal environment such as rural and urban environments, including exposure to farming, and exposure to pathogens have shown to affect human milk immune factor variation.

=== Geographic location ===
Geographic location is known to play a role in human milk variation, with country of residence specifically linked with immune factor variation. A study found a variation in levels of growth factor in both mature milk and colostrum to be correlated with geographic location. However, a larger study found support for consistency in the presence of a small group of immunological factors in mature milk independent of geographic location.

== Impact on health ==
=== Health outcomes for Breastfed versus formula-fed infants ===
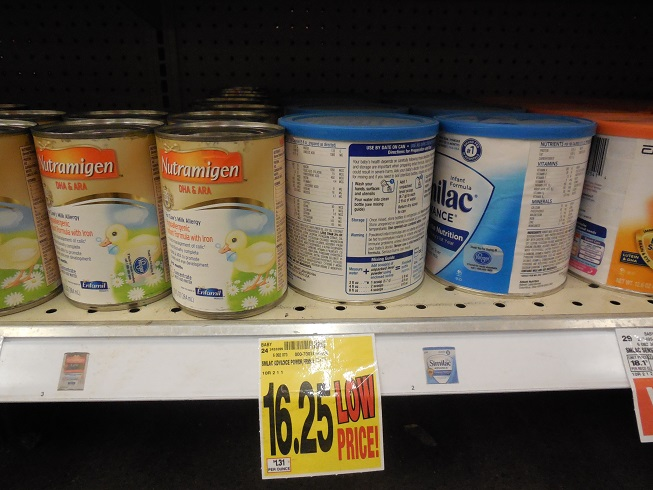
Formula

Over the last century, breastfeeding has been consistently shown to reduce infant mortality and morbidity, particularly of infectious disease. Comparative research between human milk and formula has pointed towards the bio-active components in human milk as potential proponents of its immunological protection. Studies have shown that breastfed infants respond better to vaccines, and are better protected against diarrhea, otitis media, sepsis, and necrotizing enterocolitis, celiac disease, obesity, and inflammatory bowel disease than formula-fed infants. Human breast milk is seen as particularly beneficial to infants born before full term and those that are underweight at birth who are at a higher risk of infectious diseases, such as sepsis and meningitis. Also, there is a lower chance of contamination acquired through direct breastfeeding than with mixing formula with water or other animal milks which may also help explain why human milk is more protective for the infant.

=== Long term protection ===
Because various components present in human breast milk stimulate the growth of the immune system, there is a growing interest in whether breastfeeding provides a long term protective effect against auto-immune and inflammatory diseases.

=== Milk sharing and donor milk ===
The WHO infant feeding guidelines advise the use of donor milk when the mother's milk is not available. With the understanding that breast milk provides immune protection that is absent in formula, mothers have turned to milk sharing options to in order to give formula alternatives to their infants. A donation of milk without monetary benefit defines milk sharing. In addition, milk banks have emerged to regulate and pasteurize donated milk to be sold in the legal market. The main concern with bank milk is that it has lost many immune cells, commensal microbiota and bio-active proteins during the pasteurization process. Donor milk is in high demand for infants in the Neonatal Intensive Care Unit (NICU). who have been shown to benefit most from access to human milk

Immunological consequences or benefits of milk sharing are not well documented, but it has been speculated that allo-nursing, or nursing from multiple females, may provide infants with an immune boost. The reported risk associated with unregulated sharing milk includes the possibility of the transmission of drugs, toxins, pathogenic bacteria, HIV and other viruses. However, some researchers believe that allo-nursing and milk sharing may have been part of our evolutionary past. Evidence of milk sharing history include the wet nursing practices of the 20th century, milk kinship among Islamic tradition, and documentation of allo-nursing in primates species.

== Evolutionary implications ==
There is evidence of a relationship between the microbes that have co-evolved with humans as their host and the human immune system. The transfer of microorganisms from mother to offspring is universal in animals. In humans, microbial exchange occurs primarily through placental transfer and breast milk. The presence of these complex microbial communities in the human body suggests that the immune system has been selected to remember and mediate the colonization of these microorganisms within the human host. Further, microbial dysbiosis in infants is strongly associated with immune-mediated diseases such as allergies and necrotizing enterocolitis.

In early life, an infant's immune system is considered immature due to its lack of resources necessary for defense against infection. An infant is not able to produce specific cytokines, IgA, and is limited to producing mostly IgM antibodies. The human infant is unable to adequately protect itself without the immune-stimulating and immune-modulating components present in human milk. This dynamic affirms the consensus among researchers that human milk evolved to provide not only nutritional but immunological benefits to the infant. Some researches have proposed that the mammary gland and milk production evolved as a part of the human innate immune system, with its immunological protective role predating its nutritional role.

== See also ==
- Human milk microbiome
- Human milk oligosaccharide
