= Milk immunity =

Protection provided to immune system via milk

Milk immunity is the protection provided to immune system of an infant via the biologically active components in milk, typically provided by the infant's mother.

== Mammalian milk ==
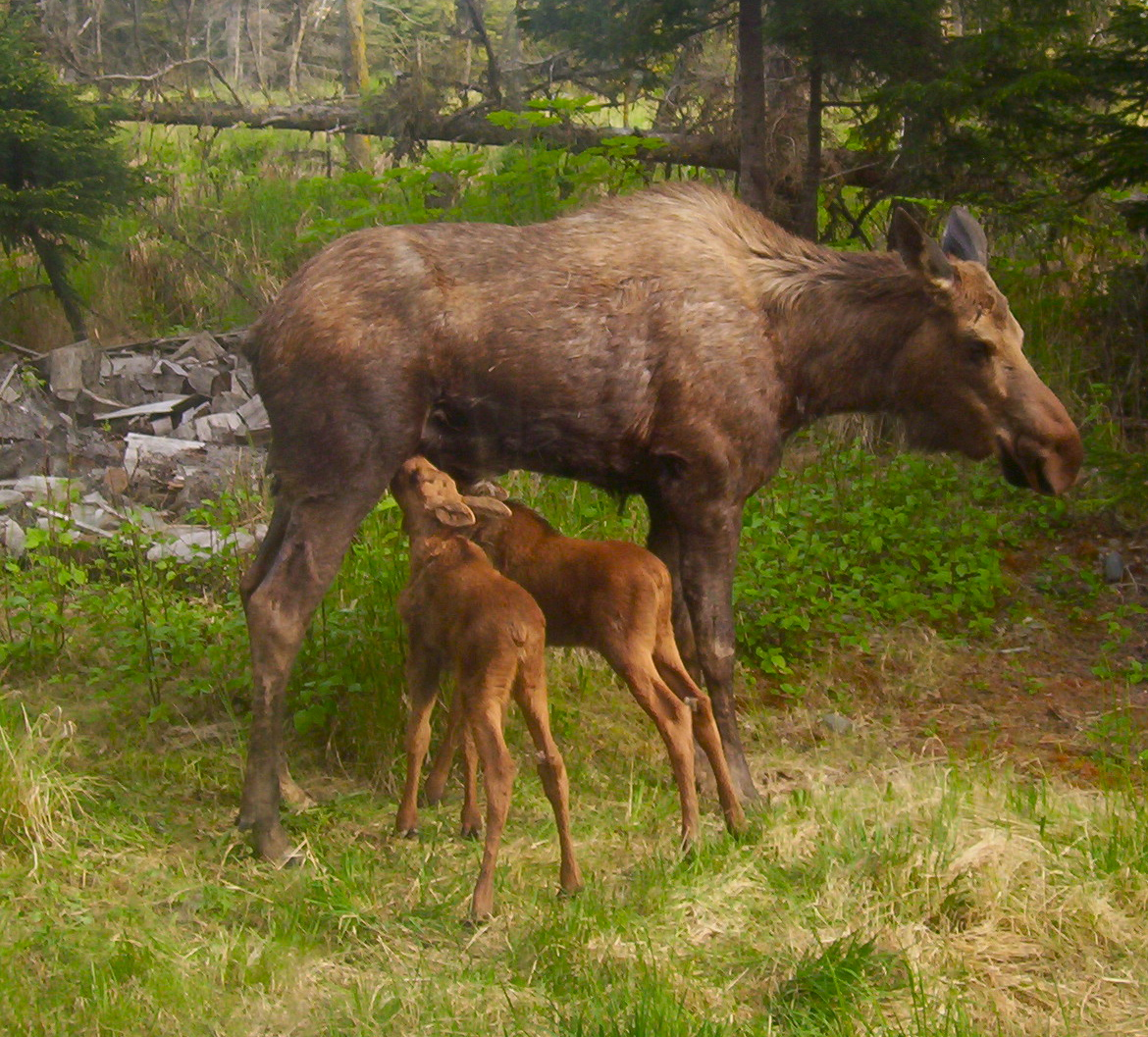
Moose calves nursing

All mammalian milk contains water, sugar, fat, vitamins, and protein, with the variation within and between species and individuals differing mainly in the amount of these components. Other than the variation in quantity of these components, not a lot is known about bio-active or immune-modulating factors in many mammalian species. However, in comparison to other mammalian milk, human milk has the most oligosaccharide diversity.

=== Bovine milk ===
Ruminant mothers do not transfer immunity to their infants during pregnancy, which makes milk the first introduction to maternal immunity calves receive. Bovine milk contains both immunoglobulins A and G, but in contrast to human milk where IgA is the most abundant, IgG is more abundant. Secretory component, IgM, both anti-inflammatory and inflammatory cytokines, and other proteins with antimicrobial functions are also present in bovine milk.

=== Human milk ===
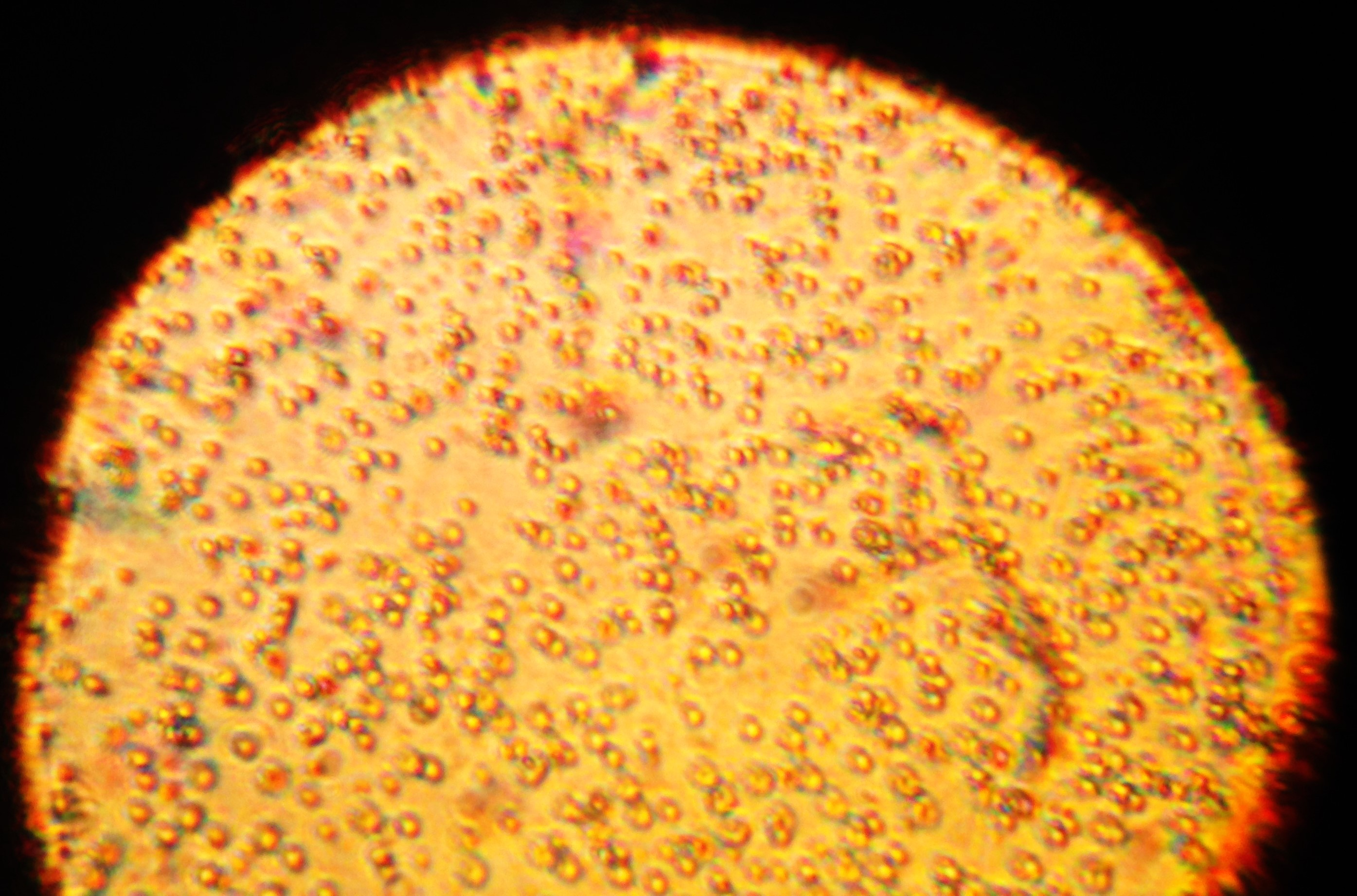
A microscopy image of a sample of human breast milk

Human milk immunity is the protection provided to the immune system of an infant via the biologically active components in human milk. Human milk was previously thought to only provide passive immunity primarily through Secretory IgA, but advances in technology have led to the identification of various immune-modulating components. Human milk constituents provide nutrition and protect the immunologically naive infant as well as regulate the infant's own immune development and growth.

Immune factors and immune-modulating components in human milk include cytokines, growth factors, proteins, microbes, and human milk oligosaccharides. Immune factors in human milk are categorized mainly as anti-inflammatory primarily working without inducing inflammation or activating the complement system.

== Avian crop milk ==
Crop milk is a secretion from the crop of a bird that is regurgitated to feed their offspring. Birds that produce this secretion include pigeons, flamingos, emperor penguins, and doves. Pigeon milk contains some immune-modulating factors such as microbes and IgA, as well as other components with similar biological activities to mammalian milk including pigeon growth factor, and transferrin.
