= List of birds of Prince Edward Island =

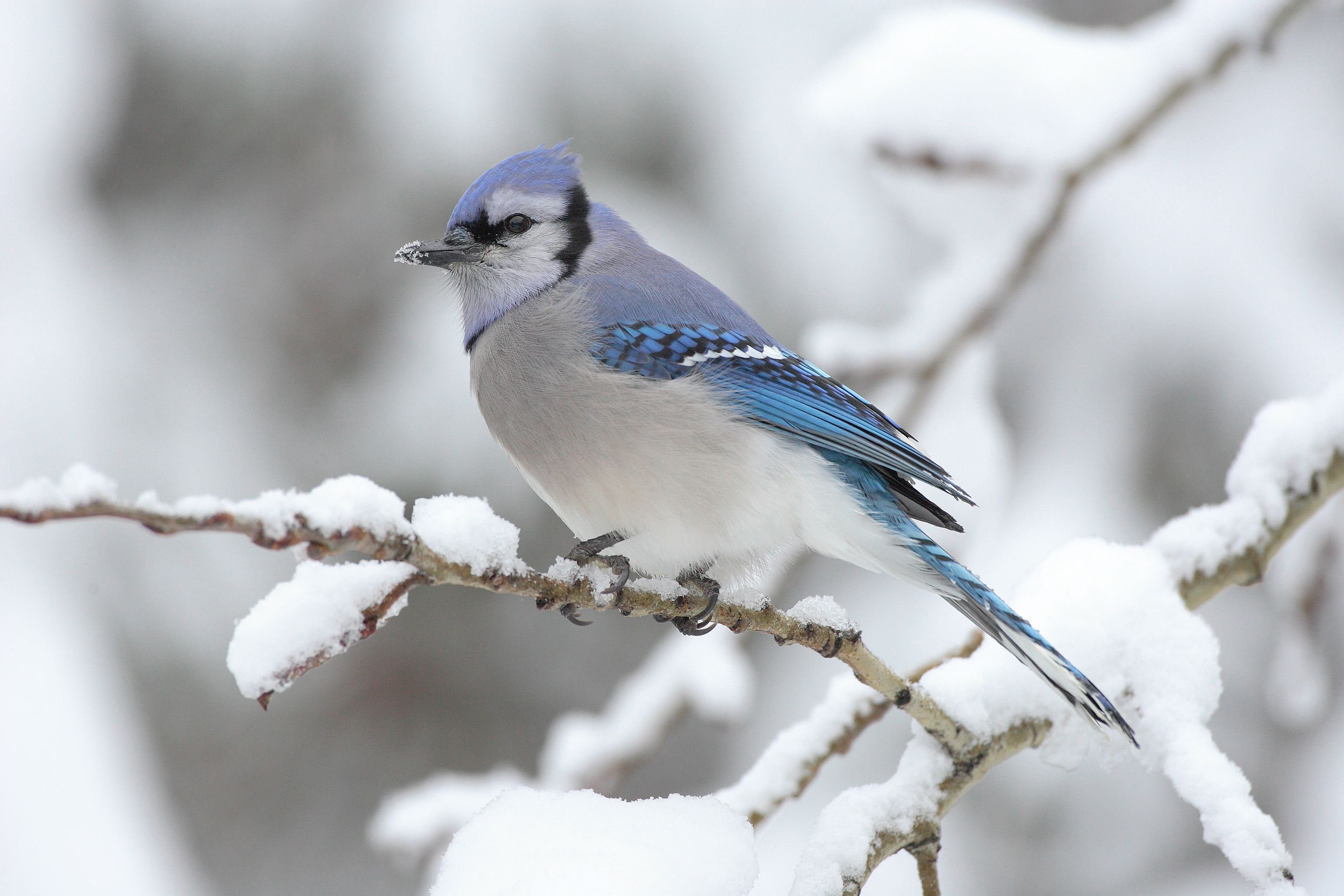
The blue jay is the provincial bird of Prince Edward Island

Prince Edward Island is the smallest province within Canada. It is part of The Maritimes and is separated to the north from New Brunswick and Nova Scotia by the Northumberland Strait. The information provided is from the most recent Field Checklist of Birds published by the Government of Prince Edward Island's Department of Agriculture and Forestry, which contains 369 species observed in the province as of 2014. Of these, 78 are accidentals, 38 are occasional, and 13 are hypotheticals as defined below. Two species have been introduced to Prince Edward Island and another four were introduced elsewhere in North America.

This list is presented in the taxonomic sequence of the Check-list of North and Middle American Birds, 7th edition through the 62nd Supplement, published by the American Ornithological Society (AOS). Common and scientific names are also those of the Check-list, except that Canadian English spellings are used and the common names of families are from the Clements taxonomy because the AOS list does not include them.

The following tags are used to categorise some species. The DAF Checklist provides abundance codes by season, and species may be abundant in one season and accidental in another. Therefore, an (A), (O), or (H) code is used here when a "higher" code does not also apply.

- (A) Accidental - "9 or fewer records per century" per the DAF Checklist
- (O) Occasional - "seen only 1 - 9 times per decade" per the DAF Checklist
- (H) Hypothetical - "unconfirmed sighting report or bird of unconfirmed origin" per the DAF Checklist
- (I) Introduced - "Introduced to Prince Edward Island and now established as a breeding population" per the DAF Checklist
- (INA) North America - Introduced to North America but not directly to Prince Edward Island

== Ducks, geese, and waterfowl ==
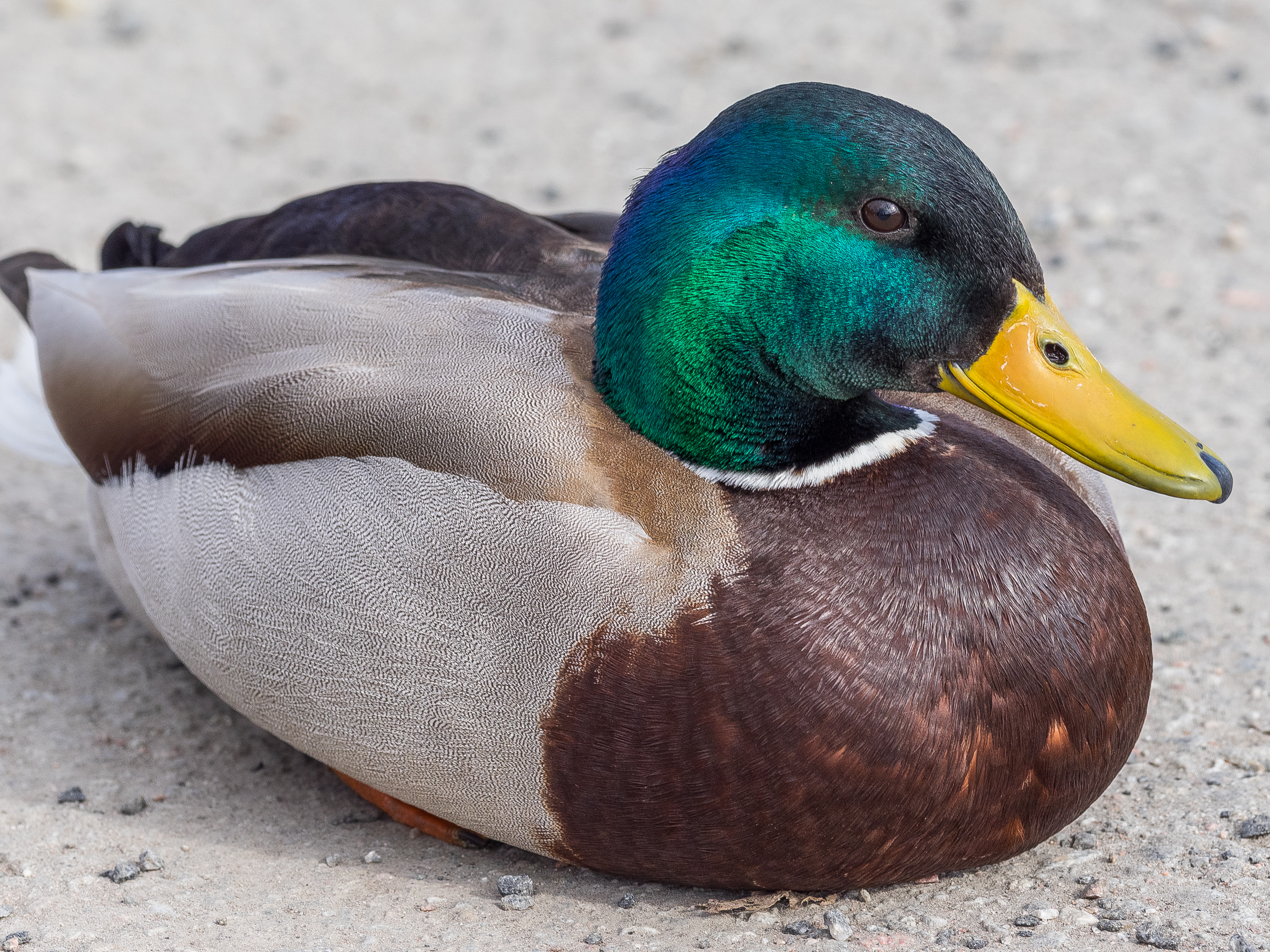
Mallard, Anas platyrhynchos

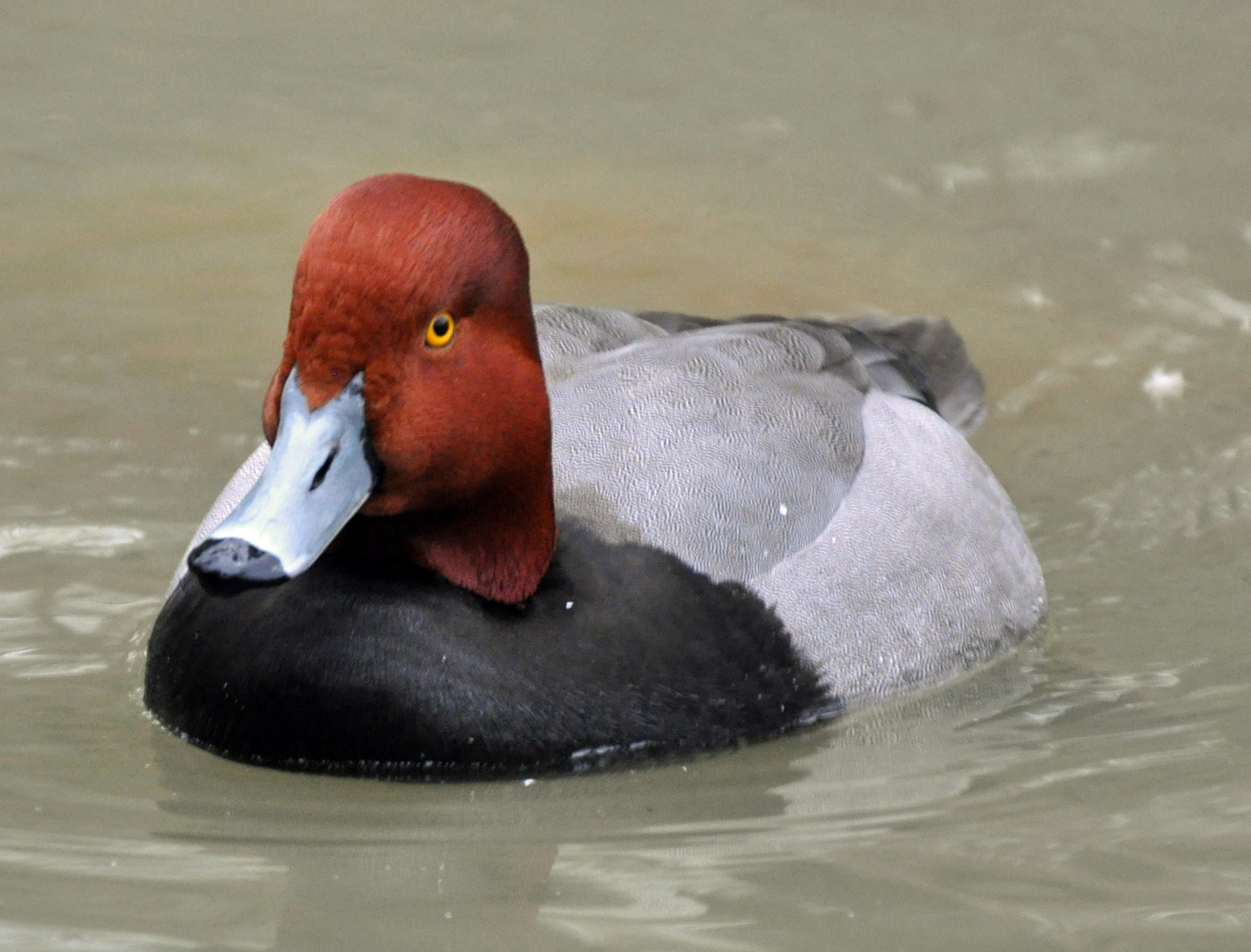
Redhead, Aythya americana

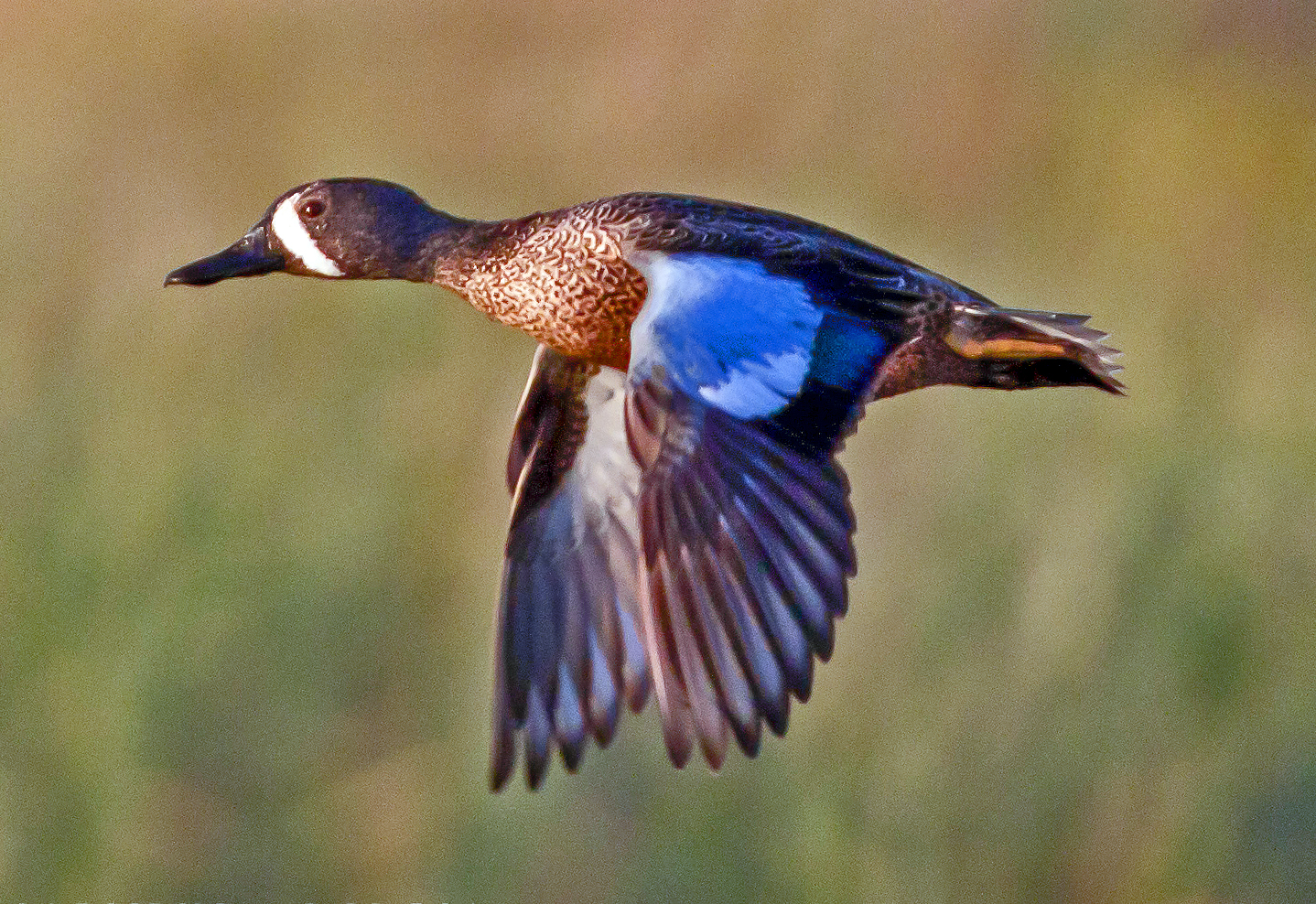
Blue-winged teal, Spatula discors

Order: Anseriformes Family: Anatidae

Anatidae includes the ducks and most duck-like waterfowl, such as geese and swans. These birds are adapted to an aquatic existence with webbed feet, bills which are flattened to a greater or lesser extent, and feathers that are excellent at shedding water due to special oils.

- Fulvous whistling-duck, Dendrocygna bicolor (A)
- Snow goose, Anser caerulescens
- Ross's goose, Anser rossii (O)
- Greater white-fronted goose, Anser albifrons
- Pink-footed goose, Anser brachyrhynchus (A)
- Brant, Branta bernicla
- Barnacle goose, Branta leucopsis (A)
- Cackling goose, Branta hutchinsii
- Canada goose, Branta canadensis
- Trumpeter swan, Cygnus buccinator (H)
- Tundra swan, Cygnus columbianus (A)
- Wood duck, Aix sponsa
- Garganey, Spatula querquedula (A)
- Blue-winged teal, Spatula discors
- Northern shoveler, Spatula clypeata
- Gadwall, Mareca strepera
- Eurasian wigeon, Mareca penelope
- American wigeon, Mareca americana
- Mallard, Anas platyrhynchos
- American black duck, Anas rubripes
- Northern pintail, Anas acuta
- Green-winged teal, Anas crecca
- Canvasback, Aythya valisineria
- Redhead, Aythya americana
- Ring-necked duck, Aythya collaris
- Tufted duck, Aythya fuligula (A)
- Greater scaup, Aythya marila
- Lesser scaup, Aythya affinis
- King eider, Somateria spectabilis
- Common eider, Somateria mollissima
- Harlequin duck, Histrionicus histrionicus
- Surf scoter, Melanitta perspicillata
- White-winged scoter, Melanitta deglandi
- Black scoter, Melanitta americana
- Long-tailed duck, Clangula hyemalis
- Bufflehead, Bucephala albeola
- Common goldeneye, Bucephala clangula
- Barrow's goldeneye, Bucephala islandica
- Hooded merganser, Lophodytes cucullatus
- Common merganser, Mergus merganser
- Red-breasted merganser, Mergus serrator
- Ruddy duck, Oxyura jamaicensis

== Pheasants, grouse, and allies ==
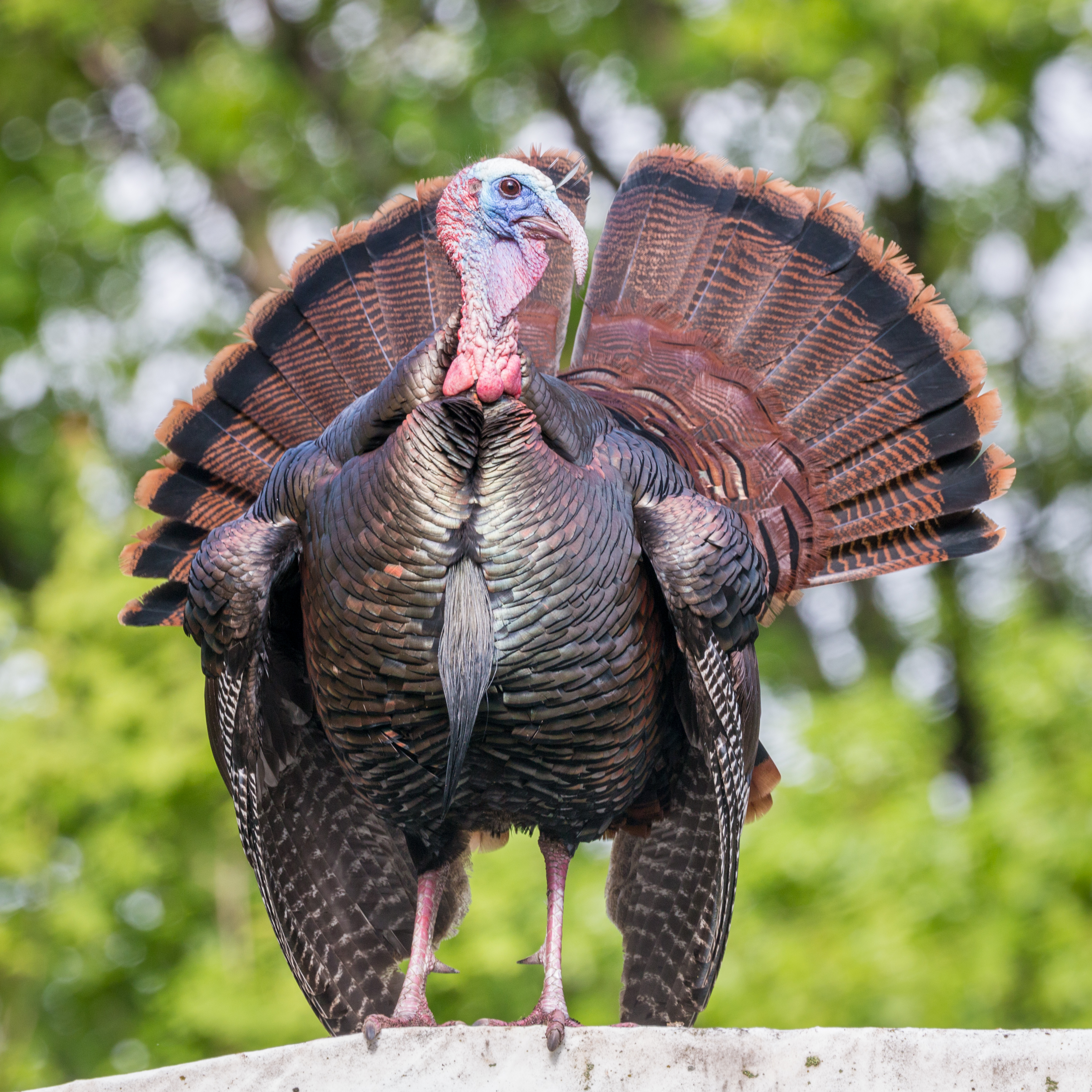
Wild turkey, Meleagris gallopavo

Order: Galliformes Family: Phasianidae

Phasianidae consists of the pheasants and their allies. These are terrestrial species, variable in size but generally plump with broad relatively short wings. Many species are gamebirds or have been domesticated as a food source for humans.

- Ruffed grouse, Bonasa umbellus
- Spruce grouse, Canachites canadensis (I) (Extirpated)
- Sharp-tailed grouse, Tympanuchus phasianellus
- Grey partridge, Perdix perdix (INA)
- Ring-necked pheasant, Phasianus colchicus (I)

== Grebes ==
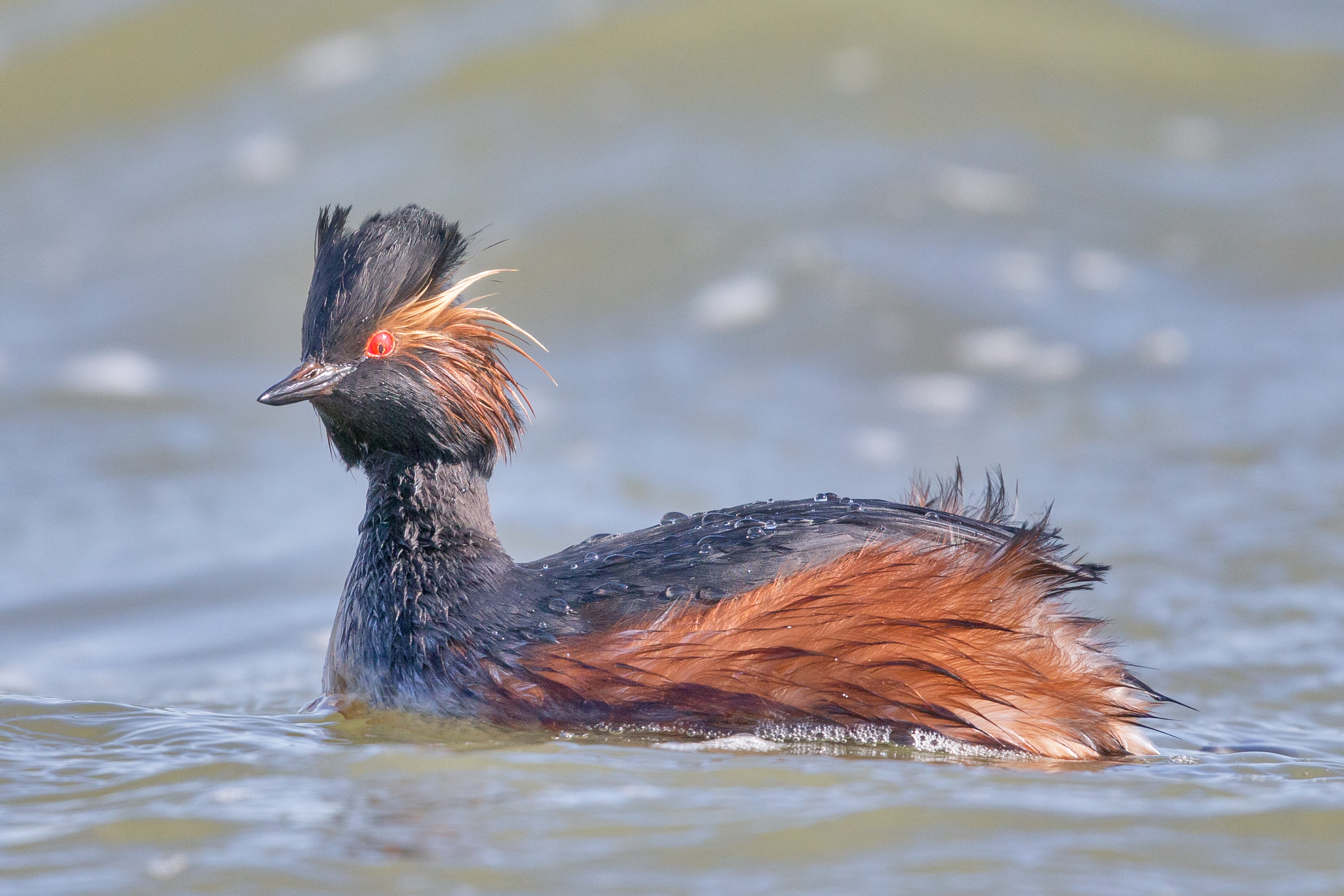
Eared grebe, Podiceps nigricollis

Order: Podicipediformes Family: Podicipedidae

Grebes are small to medium-large freshwater diving birds. They have lobed toes and are excellent swimmers and divers. However, they have their feet placed far back on the body, making them quite ungainly on land.

- Pied-billed grebe, Podilymbus podiceps
- Horned grebe, Podiceps auritus
- Red-necked grebe, Podiceps grisegena
- Eared grebe, Podiceps nigricollis (A)

== Pigeons and doves ==
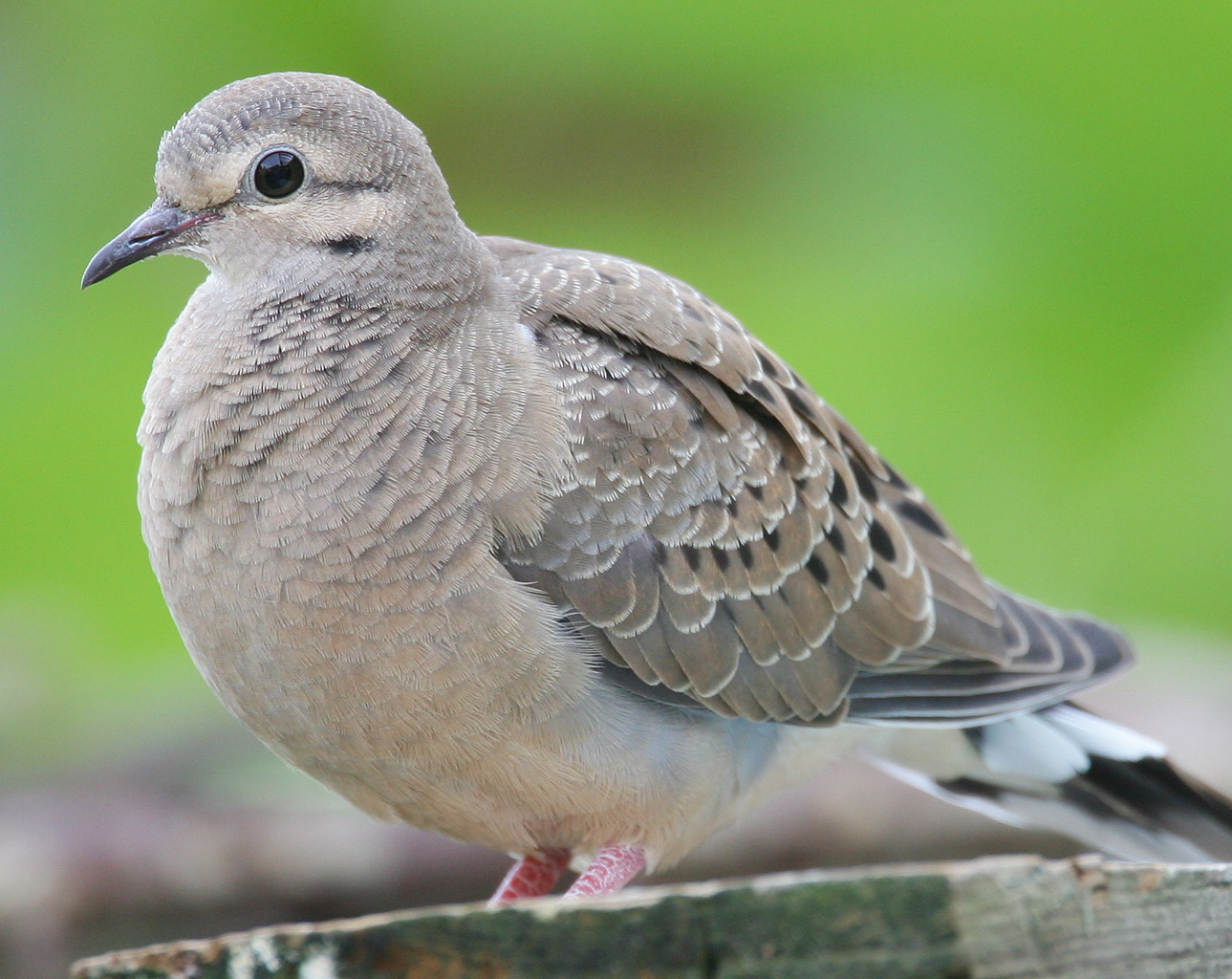
Mourning dove, Zenaida macroura

Order: Columbiformes Family: Columbidae

Pigeons and doves are stout-bodied birds with short necks and short slender bills with a fleshy cere. They feed on seeds, fruit and plants. Unlike most other birds, the doves and pigeons produce "crop milk," which is secreted by a sloughing of fluid-filled cells from the lining of the crop. Both sexes produce this highly nutritious substance to feed to the young.

- Rock pigeon, Columba livia (INA)
- Passenger pigeon, Ectopistes migratorius (Extinct)
- White-winged dove, Zenaida asiatica (A)
- Mourning dove, Zenaida macroura

== Cuckoos ==
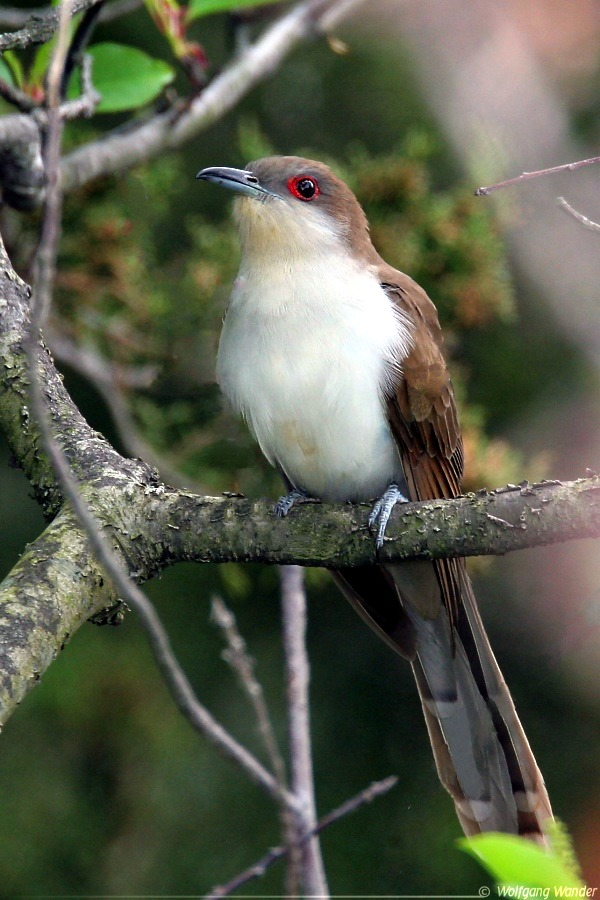
Black-billed cuckoo, Coccyzus erythropthalmus

Order: Cuculiformes Family: Cuculidae

The family Cuculidae includes cuckoos, roadrunners, and anis. These birds are of variable size with slender bodies, long tails, and strong legs.

- Yellow-billed cuckoo, Coccyzus americanus
- Black-billed cuckoo, Coccyzus erythropthalmus

== Nightjars and allies ==
Order: Caprimulgiformes Family: Caprimulgidae

Nightjars are medium-sized nocturnal birds that usually nest on the ground. They have long wings, short legs, and very short bills. Most have small feet, of little use for walking, and long pointed wings. Their soft plumage is cryptically coloured to resemble bark or leaves.

- Common nighthawk, Chordeiles minor
- Eastern whip-poor-will, Antrostomus vociferus (O)

== Swifts ==
Order: Apodiformes Family: Apodidae

The swifts are small birds which spend the majority of their lives flying. These birds have very short legs and never settle voluntarily on the ground, perching instead only on vertical surfaces. Many swifts have long swept-back wings which resemble a crescent or boomerang.

- Chimney swift, Chaetura pelagica (O)

== Hummingbirds ==
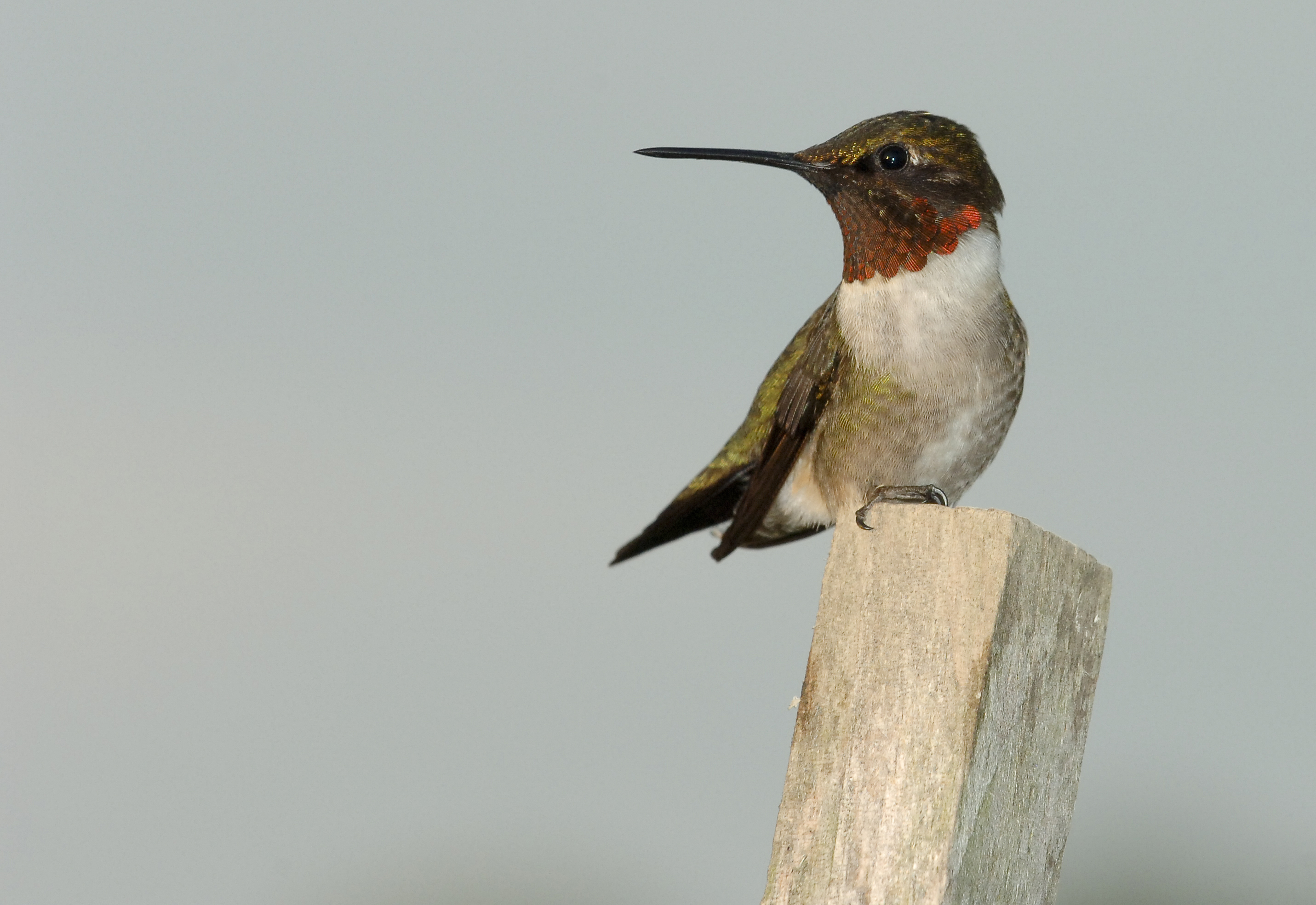
Ruby-throated hummingbird, Archilochus colubris

Order: Apodiformes Family: Trochilidae

Hummingbirds are small birds capable of hovering in mid-air due to the rapid flapping of their wings. They are the only birds that can fly backwards.

- Ruby-throated hummingbird, Archilochus colubris

== Rails, gallinules, and coots ==
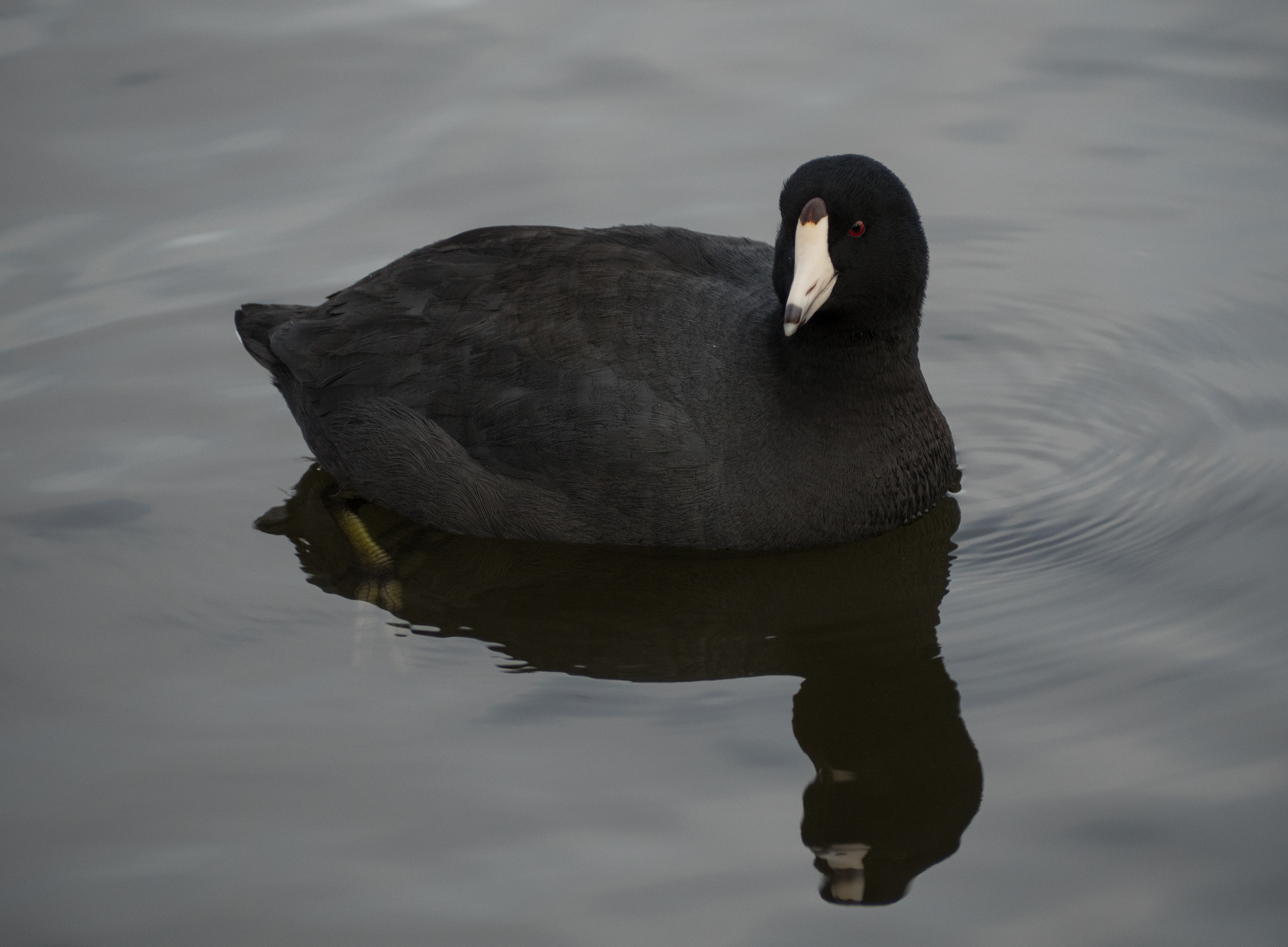
American coot, Fulica americana

Order: Gruiformes Family: Rallidae

Rallidae is a large family of small to medium-sized birds which includes the rails, crakes, coots, and gallinules. The most typical family members occupy dense vegetation in damp environments near lakes, swamps, or rivers. In general they are shy and secretive birds, making them difficult to observe. Most species have strong legs and long toes which are well adapted to soft uneven surfaces. They tend to have short, rounded wings and to be weak fliers.

- Virginia rail, Rallus limicola
- Clapper rail, Rallus crepitans (A)
- King rail, Rallus elegans (A)
- Sora, Porzana carolina
- Common gallinule, Gallinula galeata (O)
- American coot, Fulica americana
- Purple gallinule, Porphyrio martinicus (A)
- Yellow rail, Coturnicops noveboracensis (A)

== Cranes ==
Order: Gruiformes Family: Gruidae

Cranes are large, long-legged and long-necked birds. Unlike the similar-looking but unrelated herons, cranes fly with necks outstretched, not pulled back. Most have elaborate and noisy courting displays or "dances".

- Sandhill crane, Antigone canadensis

== Stilts and avocets ==
Order: Charadriiformes Family: Recurvirostridae

Recurvirostridae is a family of large wading birds which includes the avocets and stilts. The avocets have long legs and long up-curved bills. The stilts have extremely long legs and long, thin, straight bills.

- Black-necked stilt, Himantopus mexicanus (A)
- American avocet, Recurvirostra americana (A)

== Oystercatchers ==
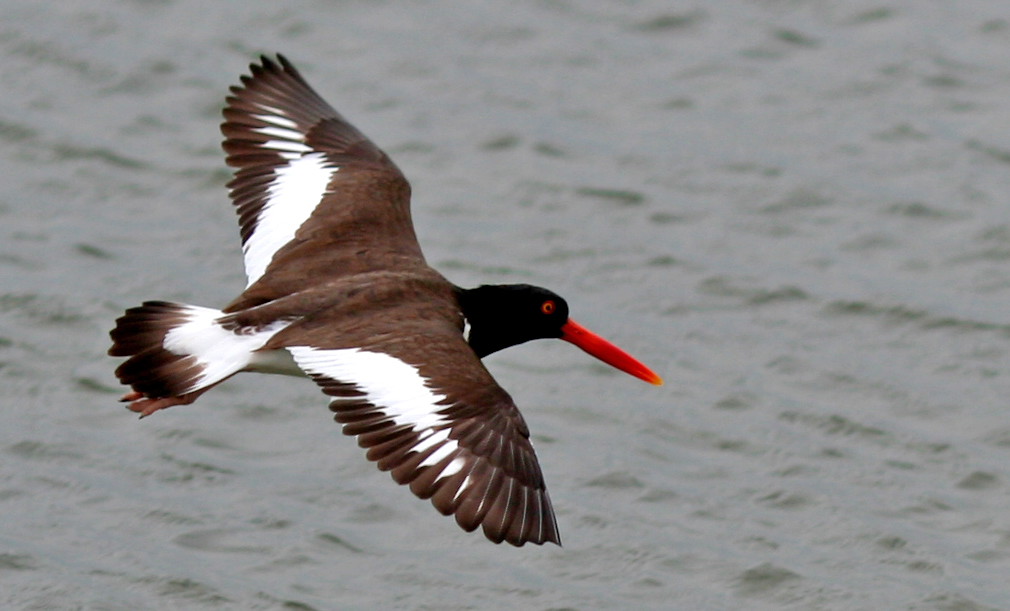
American oystercatcher, Haematopus palliatus

Order: Charadriiformes Family: Haematopodidae

The oystercatchers are large, obvious and noisy plover-like birds, with strong bills used for smashing or prising open molluscs.

- American oystercatcher, Haematopus palliatus (A)

== Plovers and lapwings ==
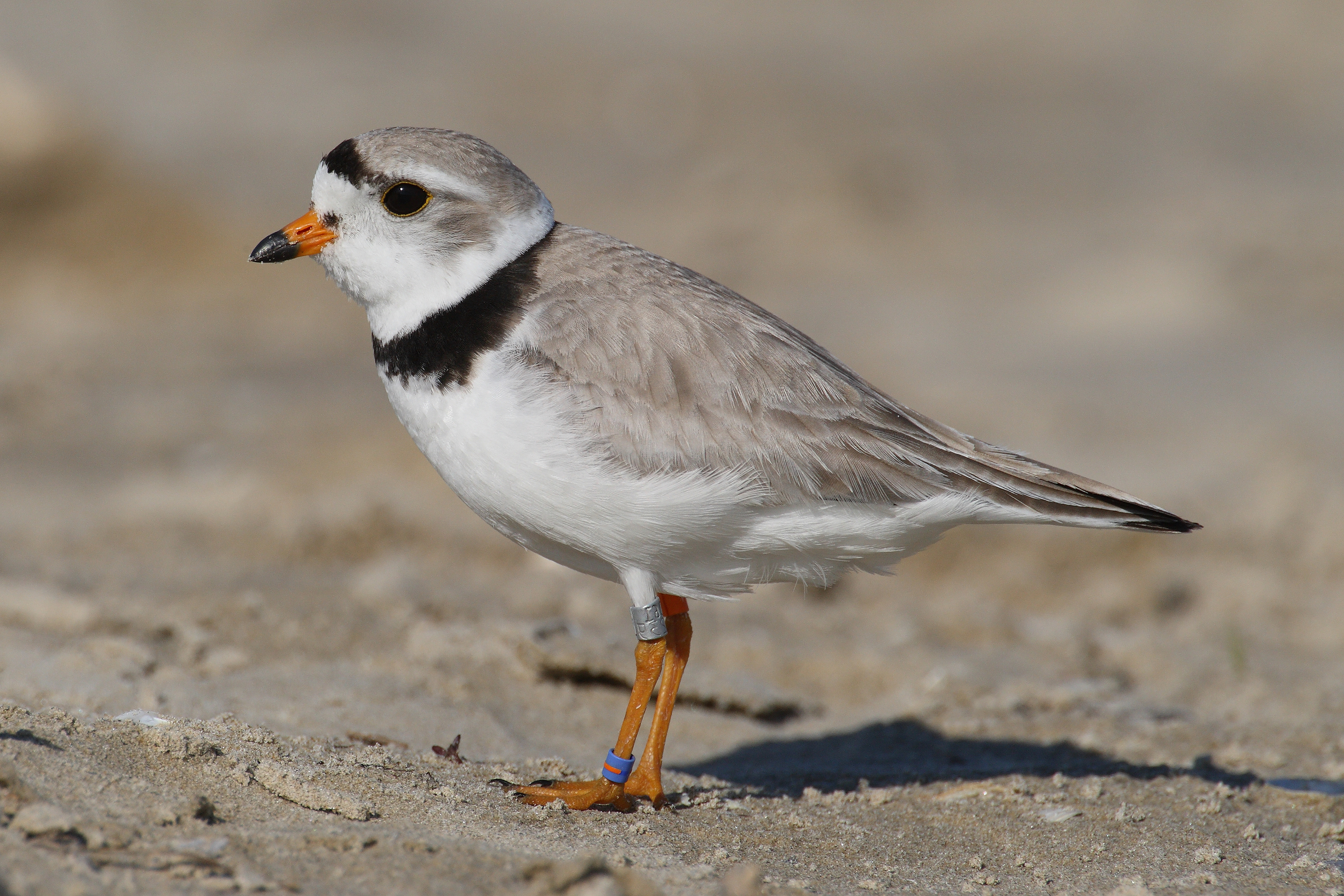
Piping plover, Charadrius melodus

Order: Charadriiformes Family: Charadriidae

The family Charadriidae includes the plovers, dotterels, and lapwings. They are small to medium-sized birds with compact bodies, short thick necks, and long, usually pointed, wings. They are found in open country worldwide, mostly in habitats near water.

- Northern lapwing, Vanellus vanellus (A)
- Black-bellied plover, Pluvialis squatarola
- American golden-plover, Pluvialis dominica
- Killdeer, Charadrius vociferus
- Semipalmated plover, Charadrius semipalmatus
- Piping plover, Charadrius melodus
- Common ringed plover, Charadrius hiaticula (A)
- Wilson's plover, Charadrius wilsonia (H)

== Sandpipers and allies ==
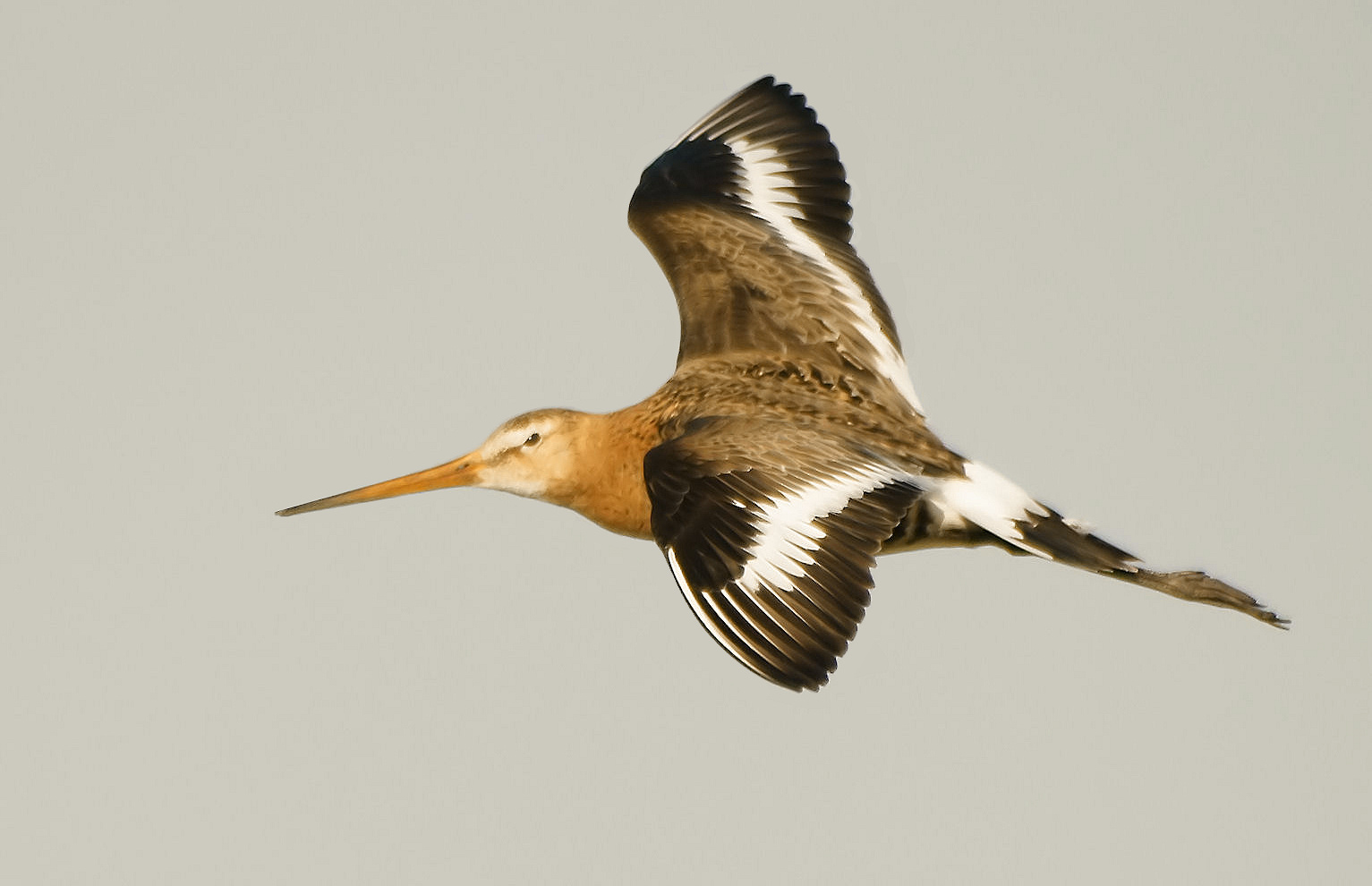
Black-tailed godwit, Limosa limosa

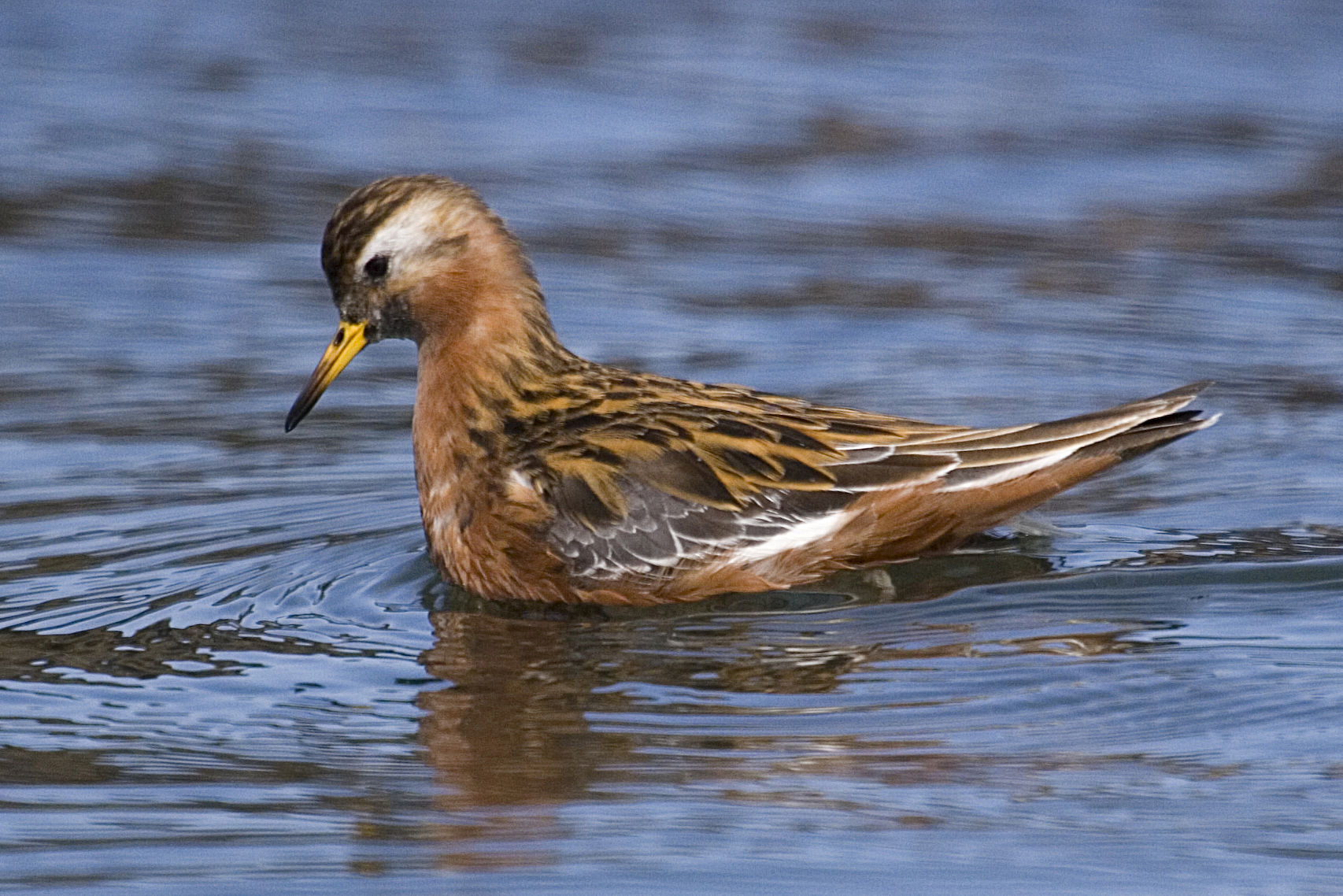
Red phalarope, Phalaropus fulicarius

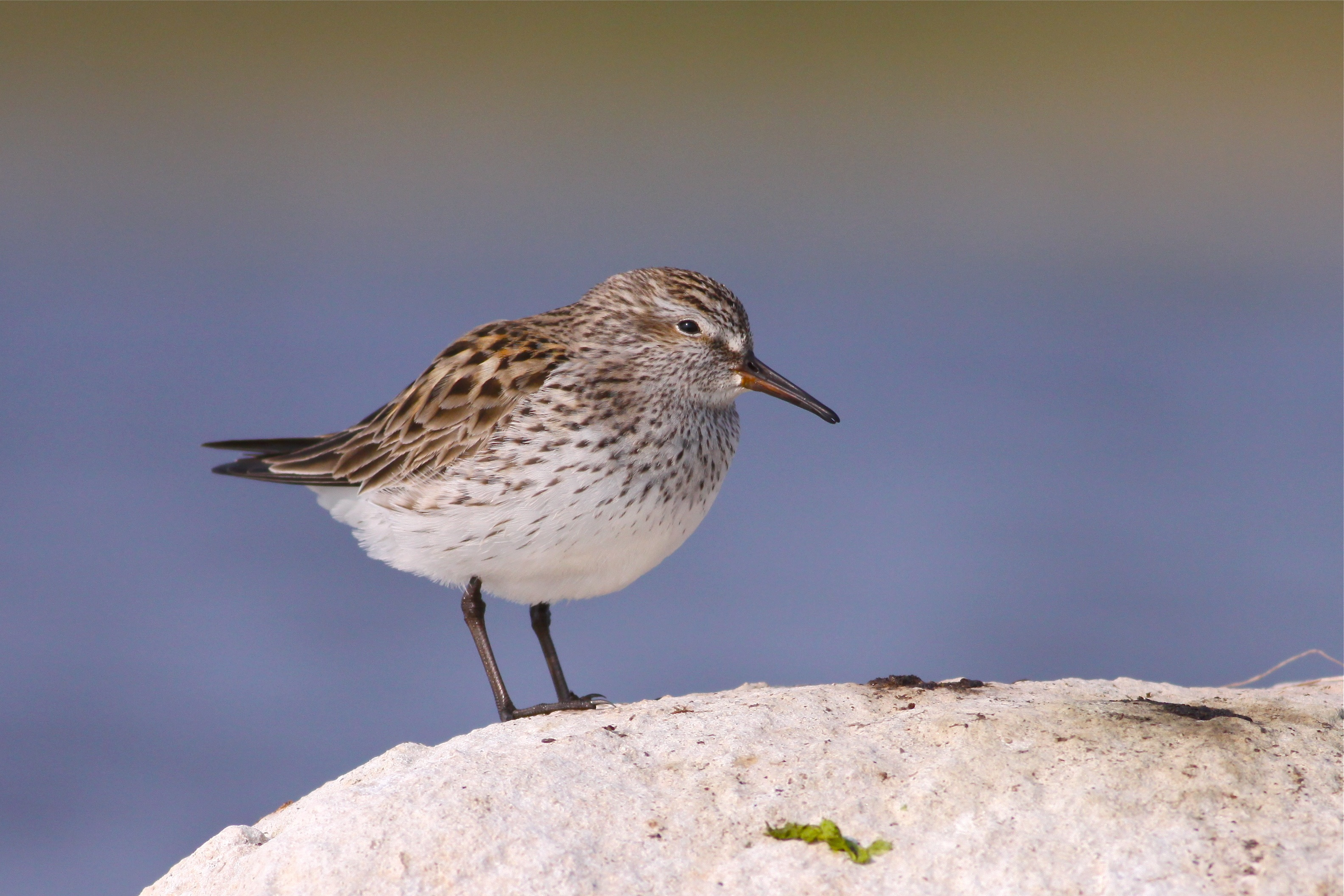
White-rumped sandpiper, Calidris fuscicollis

Order: Charadriiformes Family: Scolopacidae

Scolopacidae is a large diverse family of small to medium-sized shorebirds including the sandpipers, curlews, godwits, shanks, tattlers, woodcocks, snipes, dowitchers, and phalaropes. The majority of these species eat small invertebrates picked out of the mud or soil. Different lengths of legs and bills enable multiple species to feed in the same habitat, particularly on the coast, without direct competition for food.

- Upland sandpiper, Bartramia longicauda (A)
- Whimbrel, Numenius phaeopus
- Eskimo curlew, Numenius borealis (H) (Extirpated, possibly extinct)
- Long-billed curlew, Numenius americanus (H)
- Black-tailed godwit, Limosa limosa (A)
- Hudsonian godwit, Limosa haemastica
- Marbled godwit, Limosa fedoa (A)
- Ruddy turnstone, Arenaria interpres
- Red knot, Calidris canutus
- Ruff, Calidris pugnax (O)
- Sharp-tailed sandpiper, Calidris acuminata (A)
- Stilt sandpiper, Calidris himantopus
- Curlew sandpiper, Calidris ferruginea (O)
- Sanderling, Calidris alba
- Dunlin, Calidris alpina
- Purple sandpiper, Calidris maritima
- Baird's sandpiper, Calidris bairdii
- Little stint, Calidris minuta (A)
- Least sandpiper, Calidris minutilla
- White-rumped sandpiper, Calidris fuscicollis
- Buff-breasted sandpiper, Calidris subruficollis (O)
- Pectoral sandpiper, Calidris melanotos
- Semipalmated sandpiper, Calidris pusilla
- Western sandpiper, Calidris mauri (O)
- Short-billed dowitcher, Limnodromus griseus
- Long-billed dowitcher, Limnodromus scolopaceus (A)
- American woodcock, Scolopax minor
- Wilson's snipe, Gallinago delicata
- Spotted sandpiper, Actitis macularia
- Solitary sandpiper, Tringa solitaria
- Lesser yellowlegs, Tringa flavipes
- Willet, Tringa semipalmata
- Greater yellowlegs, Tringa melanoleuca
- Wilson's phalarope, Phalaropus tricolor
- Red-necked phalarope, Phalaropus lobatus
- Red phalarope, Phalaropus fulicarius (O)

== Skuas and jaegers ==
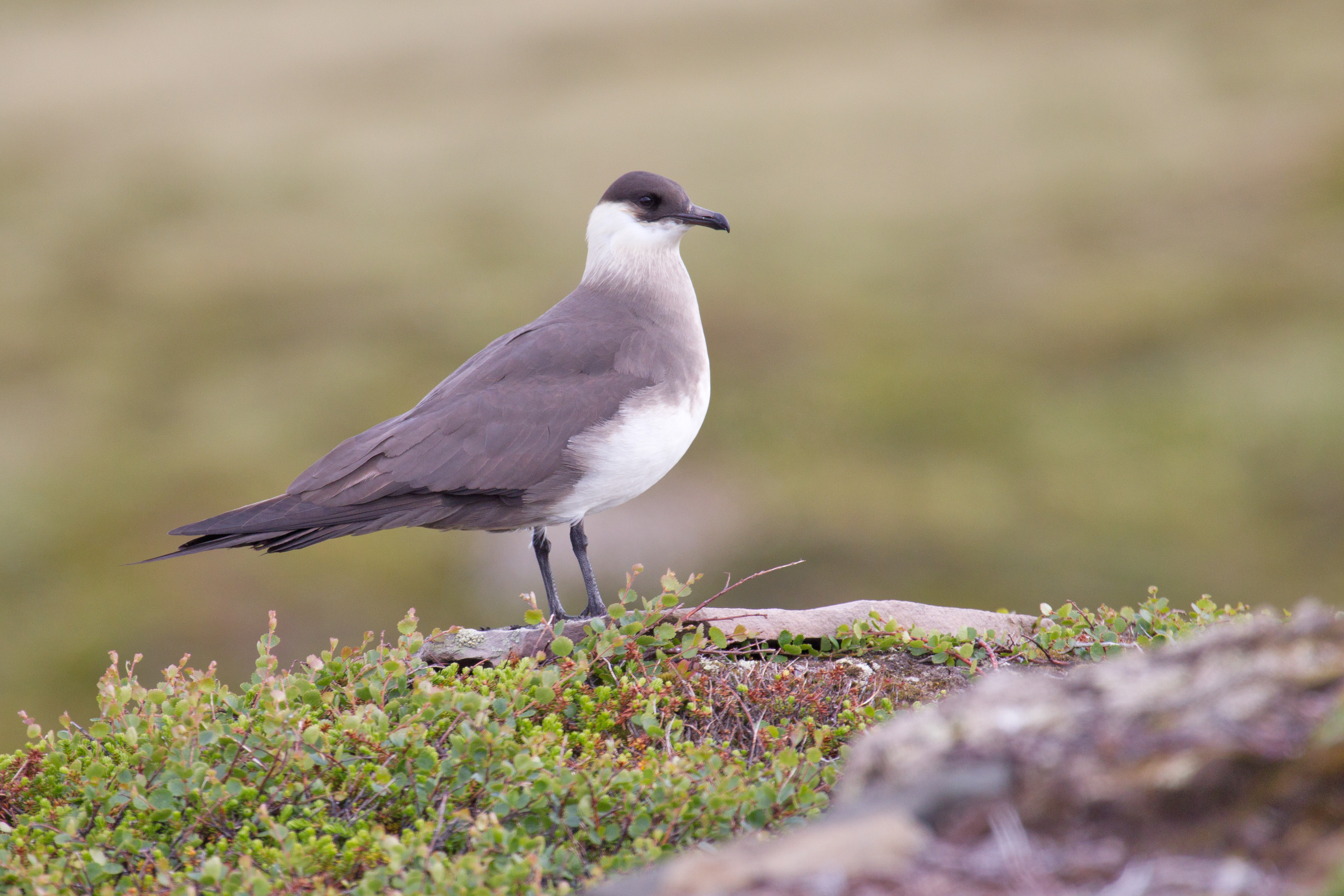
Parasitic jaeger, Stercorarius parasiticus

Order: Charadriiformes Family: Stercorariidae

Skuas and Jaegers are in general medium to large birds, typically with grey or brown plumage, often with white markings on the wings. They have longish bills with hooked tips and webbed feet with sharp claws. They look like large dark gulls, but have a fleshy cere above the upper mandible. They are strong, acrobatic fliers.

- Great skua, Stercorarius skua (A)
- Pomarine jaeger, Stercorarius pomarinus
- Parasitic jaeger, Stercorarius parasiticus
- Long-tailed jaeger, Stercorarius longicaudus (A)

== Auks, murres, and puffins ==
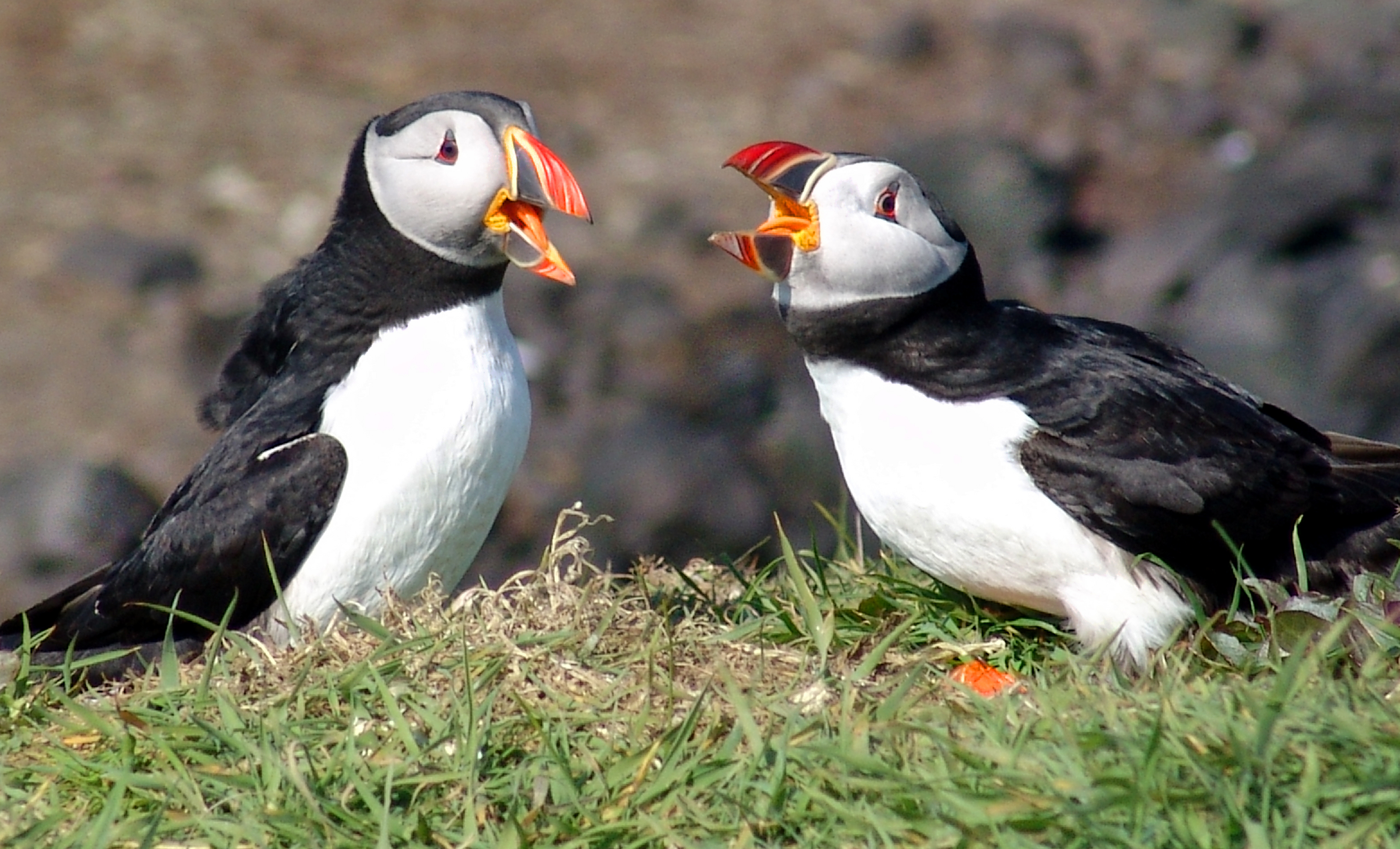
Atlantic puffin, Fratercula arctica

Order: Charadriiformes Family: Alcidae

Alcids are superficially similar to penguins due to their black-and-white colours, their upright posture, and some of their habits, however they are only distantly related to the penguins and are able to fly. Auks live on the open sea, only deliberately coming ashore to nest.

- Dovekie, Alle alle
- Common murre, Uria aalge
- Thick-billed murre, Uria lomvia
- Razorbill, Alca torda
- Great auk, Pinguinus impennis (A) (extinct)
- Black guillemot, Cepphus grylle
- Atlantic puffin, Fratercula arctica (A)

== Gulls, terns, and skimmers ==
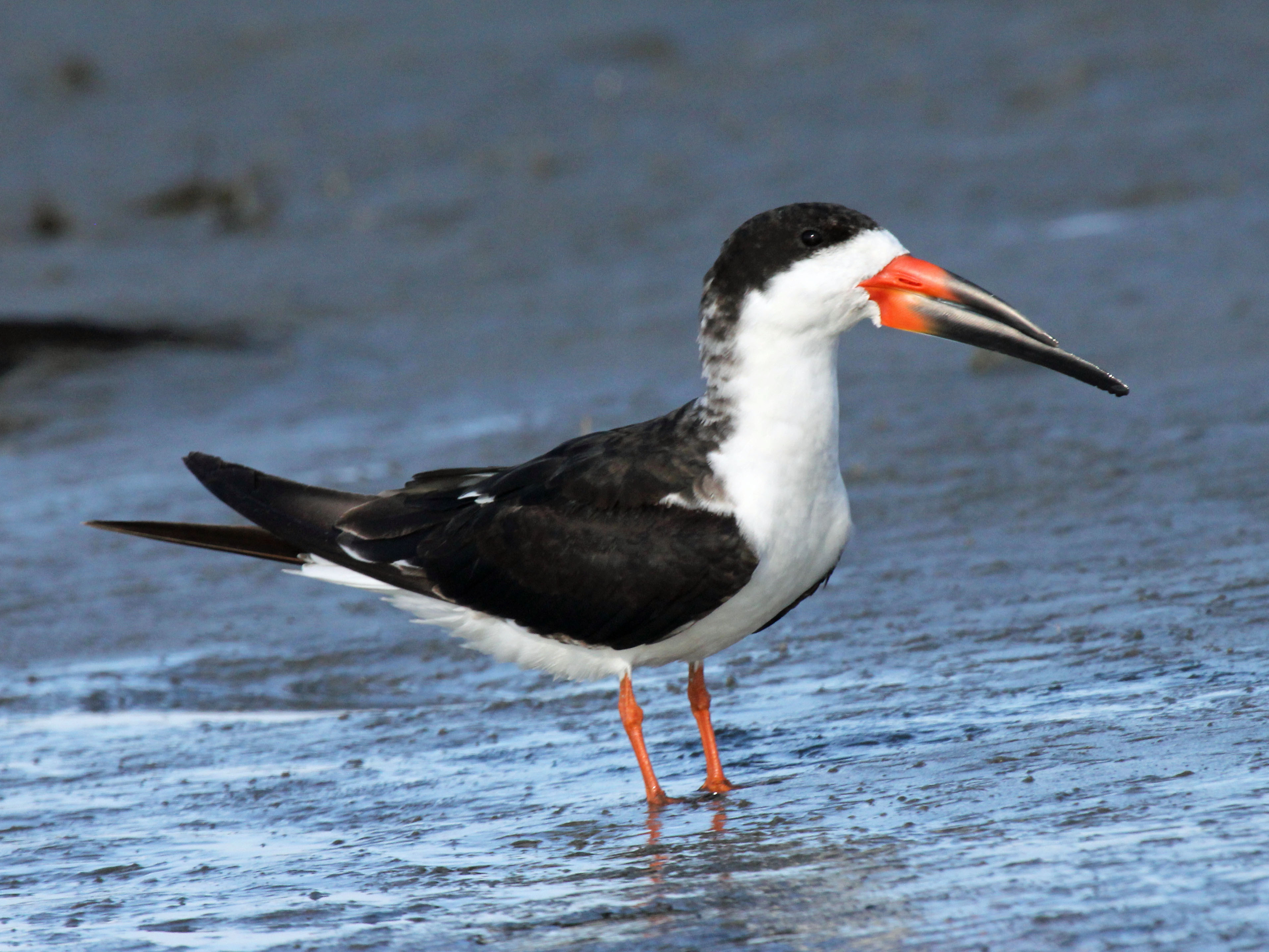
Black skimmer, Rynchops niger

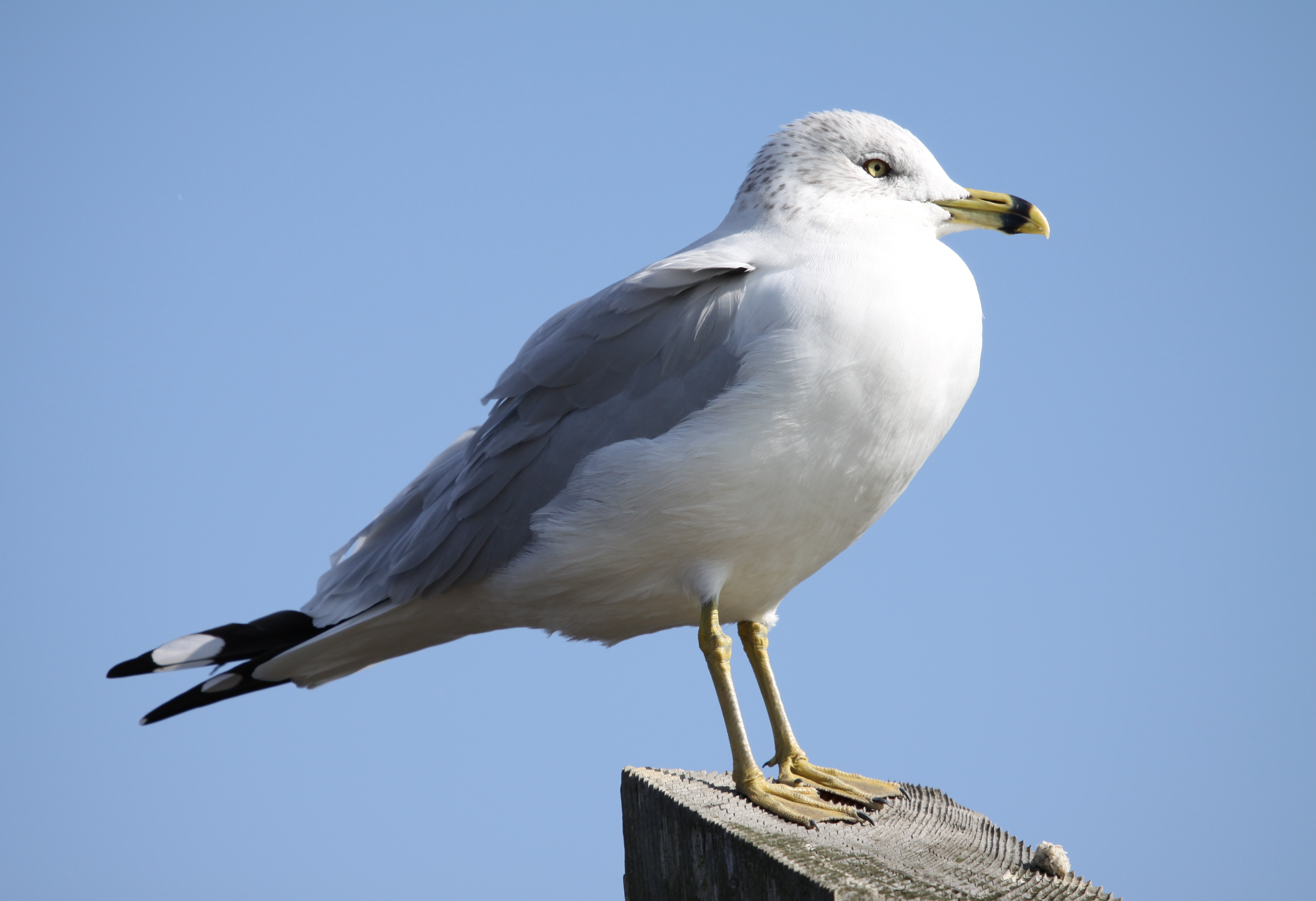
Ring-billed gull, Larus delawarensis

Order: Charadriiformes Family: Laridae

Laridae is a family of medium to large seabirds and includes gulls, terns, kittiwakes, and skimmers. They are typically grey or white, often with black markings on the head or wings. They have stout, longish bills and webbed feet.

- Black-legged kittiwake, Rissa tridactyla
- Ivory gull, Pagophila eburnea (A)
- Sabine's gull, Xema sabini (A)
- Bonaparte's gull, Chroicocephalus philadelphia
- Black-headed gull, Chroicocephalus ridibundus
- Little gull, Hydrocoleus minutus
- Laughing gull, Leucophaeus atricilla (A)
- Franklin's gull, Leucophaeus pipixcan (A)
- Common gull, Larus canus (A)
- Short-billed gull, Larus brachyrhynchus (A)
- Ring-billed gull, Larus delawarensis
- Herring gull, Larus argentatus
- Iceland gull, Larus glaucoides
- Lesser black-backed gull, Larus fuscus
- Glaucous gull, Larus hyperboreus
- Great black-backed gull, Larus marinus
- Least tern, Sternula antillarum (H)
- Caspian tern, Hydroprogne caspia
- Black tern, Chlidonias niger (O)
- Roseate tern, Sterna dougallii (H)
- Common tern, Sterna hirundo
- Arctic tern, Sterna paradisaea
- Forster's tern, Sterna forsteri (H)
- Royal tern, Thalasseus maximus (A)
- Black skimmer, Rynchops niger (A)

== Loons ==
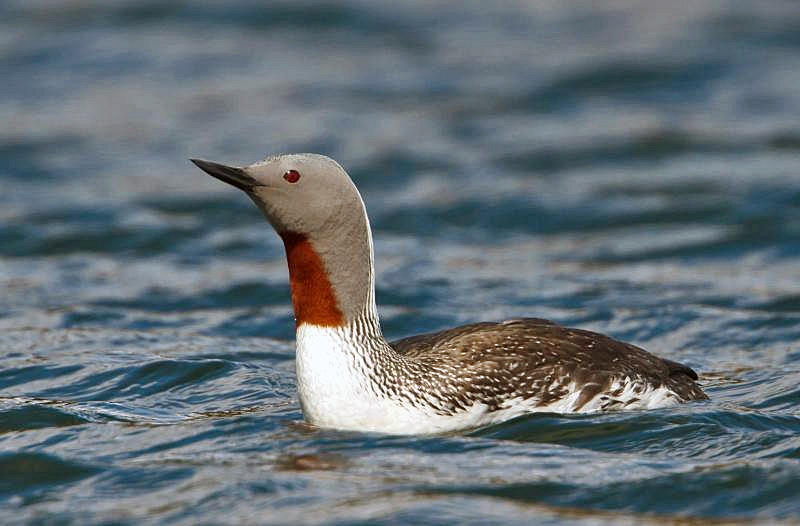
Red-throated loon, Gavia stellata

Order: Gaviiformes Family: Gaviidae

Loons are aquatic birds, the size of a large duck, to which they are unrelated. Their plumage is largely grey or black, and they have spear-shaped bills. Loons swim well and fly adequately, but are almost hopeless on land, because their legs are placed towards the rear of the body.

- Red-throated loon, Gavia stellata
- Pacific loon, Gavia pacifica (A)
- Common loon, Gavia immer

== Southern storm-petrels ==
Order: Procellariiformes Family: Oceanitidae

The storm-petrels are the smallest seabirds, relatives of the petrels, feeding on planktonic crustaceans and small fish picked from the surface, typically while hovering. The flight is fluttering and sometimes bat-like. Until 2018, this family's three species were included with the other storm-petrels in family Hydrobatidae.

- Wilson's storm-petrel, Oceanites oceanicus

== Northern storm-petrels ==
Order: Procellariiformes Family: Hydrobatidae

Though the members of this family are similar in many respects to the southern storm-petrels, including their general appearance and habits, there are enough genetic differences to warrant their placement in a separate family.

- Leach's storm-petrel, Hydrobates leucorhous

== Shearwaters and petrels ==
Order: Procellariiformes Family: Procellariidae

The procellariids are the main group of medium-sized "true petrels", characterized by united nostrils with medium septum and a long outer functional primary.

- Northern fulmar, Fulmarus glacialis
- Cory's shearwater, Calonectris diomedea (A)
- Sooty shearwater, Ardenna griseus
- Great shearwater, Ardenna gravis
- Manx shearwater, Puffinus puffinus (H)
- Sargasso shearwater, Puffinus lherminieri (H)
- Barolo shearwater, Puffinus baroli (H)

== Boobies and gannets ==
Order: Suliformes Family: Sulidae

The sulids comprise the gannets and boobies. Both groups are medium-large coastal seabirds that plunge-dive for fish.

- Northern gannet, Morus bassanus

== Cormorants and shags ==
Order: Suliformes Family: Phalacrocoracidae

Cormorants are medium-to-large aquatic birds, usually with mainly dark plumage and areas of coloured skin on the face. The bill is long, thin, and sharply hooked. Their feet are four-toed and webbed.

- Great cormorant, Phalacrocorax carbo
- Double-crested cormorant, Nannopterum auritum

== Pelicans ==
Order: Pelecaniformes Family: Pelecanidae

Pelicans are very large water birds with a distinctive pouch under their beak. Like other birds in the order Pelecaniformes, they have four webbed toes.

- American white pelican, Pelecanus erythrorhynchos (A)
- Brown pelican, Pelecanus occidentalis (A)

== Herons, egrets, and bitterns ==
Order: Pelecaniformes Family: Ardeidae

The family Ardeidae contains the herons, egrets, and bitterns. Herons and egrets are medium to large wading birds with long necks and legs. Bitterns tend to be shorter necked and more secretive. Members of Ardeidae fly with their necks retracted, unlike other long-necked birds such as storks, ibises, and spoonbills.

- American bittern, Botaurus lentiginosus
- Least bittern, Ixobrychus exilis (A)
- Great blue heron, Ardea herodias
- Great egret, Ardea alba
- Snowy egret, Egretta thula (O)
- Little blue heron, Egretta caerulea (O)
- Cattle egret, Bubulcus ibis
- Green heron, Butorides virescens (O)
- Black-crowned night-heron, Nycticorax nycticorax (A)
- Yellow-crowned night-heron, Nyctanassa violacea (A)

== Ibises and spoonbills ==
Order: Pelecaniformes Family: Threskiornithidae

The family Threskiornithidae includes the ibises and spoonbills. They have long, broad wings. Their bodies tend to be elongated, the neck more so, with rather long legs. The bill is also long, decurved in the case of the ibises, straight and distinctively flattened in the spoonbills.

- White ibis, Eudocimus albus (A)
- Glossy ibis, Plegadis falcinellus (O)

== New World vultures ==
Order: Cathartiformes Family: Cathartidae

The New World vultures are not closely related to Old World vultures, but superficially resemble them because of convergent evolution. Like the Old World vultures, they are scavengers. However, unlike Old World vultures, which find carcasses by sight, New World vultures have a good sense of smell with which they locate carcasses.

- Black vulture, Coragyps atratus (O)
- Turkey vulture, Cathartes aura

== Osprey ==
Order: Accipitriformes Family: Pandionidae

Pandionidae is a family of fish-eating birds of prey possessing a very large, powerful hooked beak for tearing flesh from their prey, strong legs, powerful talons, and keen eyesight. The family is monotypic.

- Osprey, Pandion haliaetus

== Hawks, eagles, and kites ==
Order: Accipitriformes Family: Accipitridae

Accipitridae is a family of birds of prey which includes hawks, eagles, kites, harriers, and Old World vultures. These birds have very large powerful hooked beaks for tearing flesh from their prey, strong legs, powerful talons, and keen eyesight.

- Golden eagle, Aquila chrysaetos (A)
- Northern harrier, Circus hudsonius
- Sharp-shinned hawk, Accipiter striatus
- Cooper's hawk, Accipiter cooperii
- American goshawk, Accipiter atricapillus
- Bald eagle, Haliaeetus leucocephalus
- Red-shouldered hawk, Buteo lineatus (A)
- Broad-winged hawk, Buteo platypterus
- Swainson's hawk, Buteo swainsoni (O)
- Red-tailed hawk, Buteo jamaicensis
- Rough-legged hawk, Buteo lagopus

== Barn-owls ==
Order: Strigiformes Family: Tytonidae

Owls in the family Tytonidae are medium to large owls with large heads and characteristic heart-shaped faces.

- Barn owl, Tyto Alba (A)

== Owls ==
Order: Strigiformes Family: Strigidae

Typical owls are small to large solitary nocturnal birds of prey. They have large forward-facing eyes and ears, a hawk-like beak, and a conspicuous circle of feathers around each eye called a facial disk.

- Eastern screech-owl, Megascops asio (A)
- Great horned owl, Bubo virginianus
- Snowy owl, Bubo scandiacus
- Northern hawk owl, Surnia ulula
- Barred owl, Strix varia
- Great grey owl, Strix nebulosa (A)
- Long-eared owl, Asio otus (A)
- Short-eared owl, Asio flammeus
- Boreal owl, Aegolius funereus (O)
- Northern saw-whet owl, Aegolius acadicus

== Kingfishers ==
Order: Coraciiformes Family: Alcedinidae

Kingfishers are medium-sized birds with large heads, long, pointed bills, short legs, and stubby tails.

- Belted kingfisher, Megaceryle alcyon

== Woodpeckers ==
Order: Piciformes Family: Picidae

Woodpeckers are small to medium-sized birds with chisel-like beaks, short legs, stiff tails, and long tongues used for capturing insects. Some species have feet with two toes pointing forward and two backward, while several species have only three toes. Many woodpeckers have the habit of tapping noisily on tree trunks with their beaks.

- Red-headed woodpecker, Melanerpes erythrocephalus (A)
- Red-bellied woodpecker, Melanerpes carolinus
- Yellow-bellied sapsucker, Sphyrapicus varius
- American three-toed woodpecker, Picoides dorsalis (O)
- Black-backed woodpecker, Picoides arcticus
- Downy woodpecker, Dryobates pubescens
- Hairy woodpecker, Dryobates villosus
- Northern flicker, Colaptes auratus
- Pileated woodpecker, Dryocopus pileatus

== Falcons and caracaras ==
Order: Falconiformes Family: Falconidae

Falconidae is a family of diurnal birds of prey, notably the falcons and caracaras. They differ from hawks, eagles, and kites in that they kill with their beaks instead of their talons.

- American kestrel, Falco sparverius
- Merlin, Falco columbarius
- Gyrfalcon, Falco rusticolus
- Peregrine falcon, Falco peregrinus

== Tyrant flycatchers ==
Order: Passeriformes Family: Tyrannidae

Tyrant flycatchers are Passerine birds which occur throughout North and South America. They superficially resemble the Old World flycatchers, but are more robust and have stronger bills. They do not have the sophisticated vocal capabilities of the songbirds. Most, but not all, are rather plain. As the name implies, most are insectivorous.

- Great crested flycatcher, Myiarchus crinitus (O)
- Western kingbird, Tyrannus verticalis (A)
- Eastern kingbird, Tyrannus tyrannus
- Scissor-tailed flycatcher, Tyrannus forficatus (O)
- Fork-tailed flycatcher, Tyrannus savana (A)
- Olive-sided flycatcher, Contopus cooperi
- Eastern wood-pewee, Contopus virens
- Yellow-bellied flycatcher, Empidonax flaviventris
- Alder flycatcher, Empidonax alnorum
- Willow flycatcher, Empidonax traillii (O)
- Least flycatcher, Empidonax minimus
- Eastern phoebe, Sayornis phoebe
- Say's phoebe, Sayornis saya (A)

== Vireos, shrike-babblers, and erpornis ==
Order: Passeriformes Family: Vireonidae

The vireos are a group of small to medium-sized passerine birds mostly restricted to the New World, though a few other members of the family are found in Asia. They are typically greenish in colour and resemble wood-warblers apart from their heavier bills.

- White-eyed vireo, Vireo griseus (A)
- Yellow-throated vireo, Vireo flavifrons (A)
- Blue-headed vireo, Vireo solitarius
- Philadelphia vireo, Vireo philadelphicus
- Warbling vireo, Vireo gilvus (O)
- Red-eyed vireo, Vireo olivaceus

== Shrikes ==
Order: Passeriformes Family: Laniidae

Shrikes are passerine birds known for their habit of catching other birds and small animals and impaling the uneaten portions of their bodies on thorns. A shrike's beak is hooked, like that of a typical bird of prey.

- Loggerhead shrike, Lanius ludovicianus (A)
- Northern shrike, Lanius borealis

== Crows, jays, and magpies ==
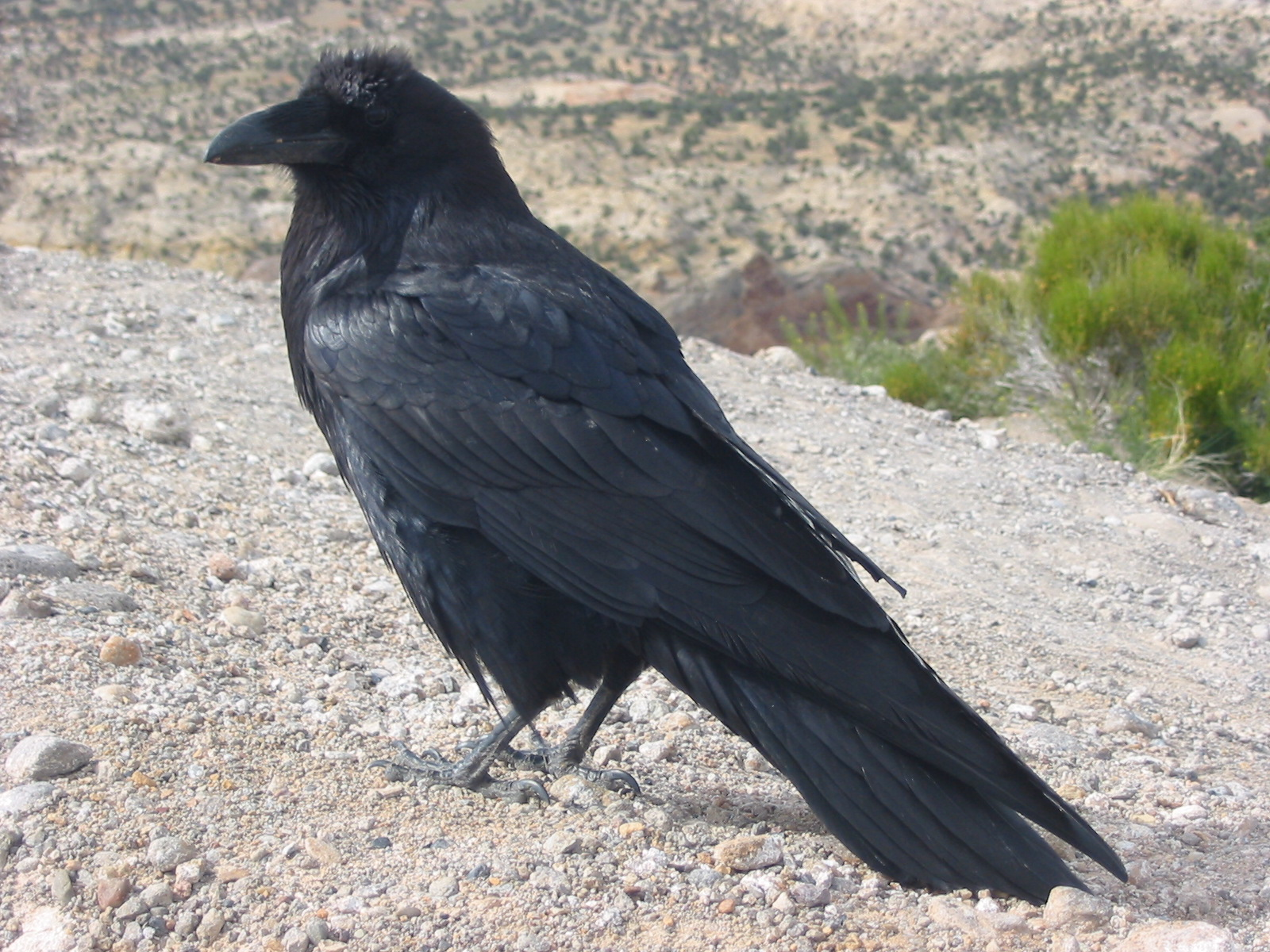
Common raven, Corvus corax

Order: Passeriformes Family: Corvidae

The family Corvidae includes crows, ravens, jays, choughs, magpies, treepies, nutcrackers, and ground jays. Corvids are above average in size among the Passeriformes, and some of the larger species show high levels of intelligence.

- Canada jay, Perisoreus canadensis
- Blue jay, Cyanocitta cristata
- Eurasian jackdaw, Corvus monedula (H)
- American crow, Corvus brachyrhynchos
- Common raven, Corvus corax

== Tits, chickadees, and titmice ==
Order: Passeriformes Family: Paridae

The Paridae are mainly small stocky woodland species with short stout bills. Some have crests. They are adaptable birds, with a mixed diet including seeds and insects.

- Black-capped chickadee, Poecile atricapilla
- Boreal chickadee, Poecile hudsonica

== Larks ==
Order: Passeriformes Family: Alaudidae

Larks are small terrestrial birds with often extravagant songs and display flights. Most larks are fairly dull in appearance. Their food is insects and seeds.

- Horned lark, Eremophila alpestris

== Swallows ==
Order: Passeriformes Family: Hirundinidae

The family Hirundinidae is adapted to aerial feeding. They have a slender streamlined body, long pointed wings, and a short bill with a wide gape. The feet are adapted to perching rather than walking, and the front toes are partially joined at the base.

- Bank swallow, Riparia riparia
- Tree swallow, Tachycineta bicolor
- Northern rough-winged swallow, Stelgidopteryx serripennis (A)
- Purple martin, Progne subis (O)
- Barn swallow, Hirundo rustica
- Cliff swallow, Petrochelidon pyrrhonota (O)
- Cave swallow, Petrochelidon fulva (A)

== Kinglets ==
Order: Passeriformes Family: Regulidae

The kinglets are a small family of birds which resemble the titmice. They are very small insectivorous birds. The adults have coloured crowns, giving rise to their name.

- Ruby-crowned kinglet, Corthylio calendula
- Golden-crowned kinglet, Regulus satrapa

== Waxwings ==
Order: Passeriformes Family: Bombycillidae

The waxwings are a group of passerine birds with soft silky plumage and unique red tips to some of the wing feathers. In the Bohemian and cedar waxwings, these tips look like sealing wax and give the group its name. These are arboreal birds of northern forests. They live on insects in summer and berries in winter.

- Bohemian waxwing, Bombycilla garrulus
- Cedar waxwing, Bombycilla cedrorum

== Nuthatches ==
Order: Passeriformes Family: Sittidae

Nuthatches are small woodland birds. They have the unusual ability to climb down trees head first, unlike other birds which can only go upwards. Nuthatches have big heads, short tails, and powerful bills and feet.

- Red-breasted nuthatch, Sitta canadensis
- White-breasted nuthatch, Sitta carolinensis

== Treecreepers ==
Order: Passeriformes Family: Certhiidae

Treecreepers are small woodland birds, brown above and white below. They have thin pointed down-curved bills, which they use to extricate insects from bark. They have stiff tail feathers, like woodpeckers, which they use to support themselves on vertical trees.

- Brown creeper, Certhia americana

== Gnatcatchers ==
Order: Passeriformes Family: Polioptilidae

These dainty birds resemble Old World warblers in their structure and habits, moving restlessly through the foliage seeking insects. The gnatcatchers are mainly soft bluish grey in colour and have the typical insectivore's long sharp bill. Many species have distinctive black head patterns (especially males) and long, regularly cocked, black-and-white tails.

- Blue-grey gnatcatcher, Polioptila caerulea

== Wrens ==
Order: Passeriformes Family: Troglodytidae

Wrens are small and inconspicuous birds, except for their loud songs. They have short wings and thin down-turned bills. Several species often hold their tails upright. All are insectivorous.

- Rock wren, Salpinctes obsoletus (A)
- House wren, Troglodytes aedon (A)
- Winter wren, Troglodytes hiemalis
- Sedge wren, Cistothorus platensis (A)
- Marsh wren, Cistothorus palustris (A)
- Carolina wren, Thryothorus ludovicianus (A)

== Mockingbirds and thrashers ==
Order: Passeriformes Family: Mimidae

The mimids are a family of passerine birds which includes thrashers, mockingbirds, tremblers, and the New World catbirds. These birds are notable for their vocalization, especially their remarkable ability to mimic a wide variety of birds and other sounds heard outdoors. The species tend towards dull greys and browns in their appearance.

- Grey catbird, Dumetella carolinensis
- Brown thrasher, Toxostoma rufum (O)
- Northern mockingbird, Mimus polyglottos

== Starlings ==
Order: Passeriformes Family: Sturnidae

Starlings and mynas are small to medium-sized Old World passerine birds with strong feet. Their flight is strong and direct and most are very gregarious. Their preferred habitat is fairly open country, and they eat insects and fruit. The plumage of several species is dark with a metallic sheen.

- European starling, Sturnus vulgaris (INA)

== Thrushes and allies ==
Order: Passeriformes Family: Turdidae

The thrushes are a group of passerine birds that occur mainly but not exclusively in the Old World. They are plump, soft plumaged, small to medium-sized insectivores or sometimes omnivores, often feeding on the ground. Many have attractive songs.

- Eastern bluebird, Sialia sialis
- Townsend's solitaire, Myadestes townsendi (O)
- Veery, Catharus fuscescens
- Grey-cheeked thrush, Catharus minimus
- Bicknell's thrush, Catharus bicknelli (A)
- Swainson's thrush, Catharus ustulatus
- Hermit thrush, Catharus guttatus
- Wood thrush, Hylocichla mustelina (A)
- Fieldfare, Turdus pilaris (A)
- American robin, Turdus migratorius
- Varied thrush, Ixoreus naevius (A)

== Old World flycatchers ==
Order: Passeriformes Family: Muscicapidae

The Old World flycatchers are a large family of small passerine birds. These are mainly small arboreal insectivores, many of which, as the name implies, take their prey on the wing.

- Northern wheatear, Oenanthe oenanthe (A)

== Old World sparrows ==
Order: Passeriformes Family: Passeridae

Old World sparrows are small passerine birds. In general, sparrows tend to be small plump brownish or greyish birds with short tails and short powerful beaks. Sparrows are seed eaters, but they also consume small insects.

- House sparrow, Passer domesticus (INA)

== Wagtails and pipits ==
Order: Passeriformes Family: Motacillidae

Motacillidae is a family of small passerine birds with medium to long tails. They include the wagtails, longclaws, and pipits. They are slender ground-feeding insectivores of open country.

- American pipit, Anthus rubescens

== Finches, euphonias, and allies ==
Order: Passeriformes Family: Fringillidae

Finches are seed-eating passerine birds, that are small to moderately large and have a strong beak, usually conical and in some species very large. All have twelve tail feathers and nine primaries. These birds have a bouncing flight with alternating bouts of flapping and gliding on closed wings, and most sing well.

- Evening grosbeak, Coccothraustes vespertinus
- Pine grosbeak, Pinicola enucleator
- House finch, Haemorhous mexicanus (O) (Native to the southwestern U.S.; introduced in the east)
- Purple finch, Haemorhous purpureus
- Common redpoll, Acanthis flammea
- Hoary redpoll, Acanthis hornemanni
- Red crossbill, Loxia curvirostra
- White-winged crossbill, Loxia leucoptera
- Pine siskin, Spinus pinus
- American goldfinch, Spinus tristis

== Longspurs and snow buntings ==
Order: Passeriformes Family: Calcariidae

The Calcariidae are a group of passerine birds that were traditionally grouped with the New World sparrows, but differ in a number of respects and are usually found in open grassy areas.

- Lapland longspur, Calcarius lapponicus
- Snow bunting, Plectrophenax nivalis

== New World sparrows ==
Order: Passeriformes Family: Passerellidae

Until 2017, these species were considered part of the family Emberizidae. Most of the species are known as sparrows, but these birds are not closely related to the Old World sparrows which are in the family Passeridae. Many of these have distinctive head patterns.

- Grasshopper sparrow, Ammodramus savannarum (A)
- Lark sparrow, Chondestes grammacus (A)
- Chipping sparrow, Spizella passerina
- Clay-coloured sparrow, Spizella pallida (A)
- Field sparrow, Spizella pusilla (A)
- Fox sparrow, Passerella iliaca
- American tree sparrow, Spizelloides arborea
- Dark-eyed junco, Junco hyemalis
- White-crowned sparrow, Zonotrichia leucophrys
- Harris's sparrow, Zonotrichia querula (A)
- White-throated sparrow, Zonotrichia albicollis
- Vesper sparrow, Pooecetes gramineus (O)
- Nelson's sparrow, Ammospiza nelsoni
- Henslow's sparrow, Centronyx henslowii (A)
- Savannah sparrow, Passerculus sandwichensis
- Song sparrow, Melospiza melodia
- Lincoln's sparrow, Melospiza lincolnii
- Swamp sparrow, Melospiza georgiana
- Spotted towhee, Pipilo maculatus (A)
- Eastern towhee, Pipilo erythrophthalmus

== Yellow-breasted chat ==
Order: Passeriformes Family: Icteriidae

This species was historically placed in the wood-warblers (Parulidae) but nonetheless most authorities were unsure if it belonged there. It was placed in its own family in 2017.

- Yellow-breasted chat, Icteria virens

== Troupials and allies ==
Order: Passeriformes Family: Icteridae

The icterids are a group of small to medium-sized, often colourful passerine birds restricted to the New World and include the grackles, New World blackbirds, and New World orioles. Most species have black as a predominant plumage colour, often enlivened by yellow, orange, or red.

- Yellow-headed blackbird, Xanthocephalus xanthocephalus (O)
- Bobolink, Dolichonyx oryzivorus
- Western meadowlark, Sturnella neglecta (A)
- Eastern meadowlark, Sturnella magna (O)
- Orchard oriole, Icterus spurius (A)
- Bullock's oriole, Icterus bullockii (O)
- Baltimore oriole, Icterus galbula
- Red-winged blackbird, Agelaius phoeniceus
- Brown-headed cowbird, Molothrus ater
- Rusty blackbird, Euphagus carolinus
- Brewer's blackbird, Euphagus cyanocephalus (A)
- Common grackle, Quiscalus quiscula

== New World warblers ==
Order: Passeriformes Family: Parulidae

The wood-warblers are a group of small, often colourful, passerine birds restricted to the New World. Most are arboreal, but some are more terrestrial. Most members of this family are insectivores.

- Ovenbird, Seiurus aurocapilla
- Worm-eating warbler, Helmitheros vermivorum (A)
- Northern waterthrush, Parkesia noveboracensis
- Blue-winged warbler, Vermivora cyanoptera (A)
- Black-and-white warbler, Mniotilta varia
- Prothonotary warbler, Protonotaria citrea (H)
- Swainson's warbler, Limnothlypis swainsonii (A)
- Tennessee warbler, Leiothlypis peregrina
- Orange-crowned warbler, Leiothlypis celata (O)
- Nashville warbler, Leiothlypis ruficapilla
- Mourning warbler, Geothlypis philadelphia
- Common yellowthroat, Geothlypis trichas
- Hooded warbler, Setophaga citrina (A)
- American redstart, Setophaga ruticilla
- Cape May warbler, Setophaga tigrina
- Cerulean warbler, Setophaga cerulea (H)
- Northern parula, Setophaga americana
- Magnolia warbler, Setophaga magnolia
- Bay-breasted warbler, Setophaga castanea
- Blackburnian warbler, Setophaga fusca
- Yellow warbler, Setophaga petechia
- Chestnut-sided warbler, Setophaga pensylvanica
- Blackpoll warbler, Setophaga striata
- Black-throated blue warbler, Setophaga caerulescens
- Palm warbler, Setophaga palmarum
- Pine warbler, Setophaga pinus (O)
- Yellow-rumped warbler, Setophaga coronata
- Yellow-throated warbler, Setophaga dominica (A)
- Prairie warbler, Setophaga discolor (A)
- Black-throated grey warbler, Setophaga nigrescens (A)
- Black-throated green warbler, Setophaga virens
- Canada warbler, Cardellina canadensis
- Wilson's warbler, Cardellina pusilla

== Cardinals and allies ==
Order: Passeriformes Family: Cardinalidae

The cardinals are a family of robust, seed-eating birds with strong bills. They are typically associated with open woodland. The sexes usually have distinct plumages.

- Summer tanager, Piranga rubra (O)
- Scarlet tanager, Piranga olivacea (O)
- Western tanager, Piranga ludoviciana (A)
- Northern cardinal, Cardinalis cardinalis
- Rose-breasted grosbeak, Pheucticus ludovicianus
- Black-headed grosbeak, Pheucticus melanocephalus (A)
- Blue grosbeak, Passerina caerulea (O)
- Indigo bunting, Passerina cyanea
- Painted bunting, Passerina ciris (A)
- Dickcissel, Spiza americana (O)

== See also ==
- List of birds of Canada
- Lists of birds by region
