= Crop milk =

Secretion used by some birds to feed their young

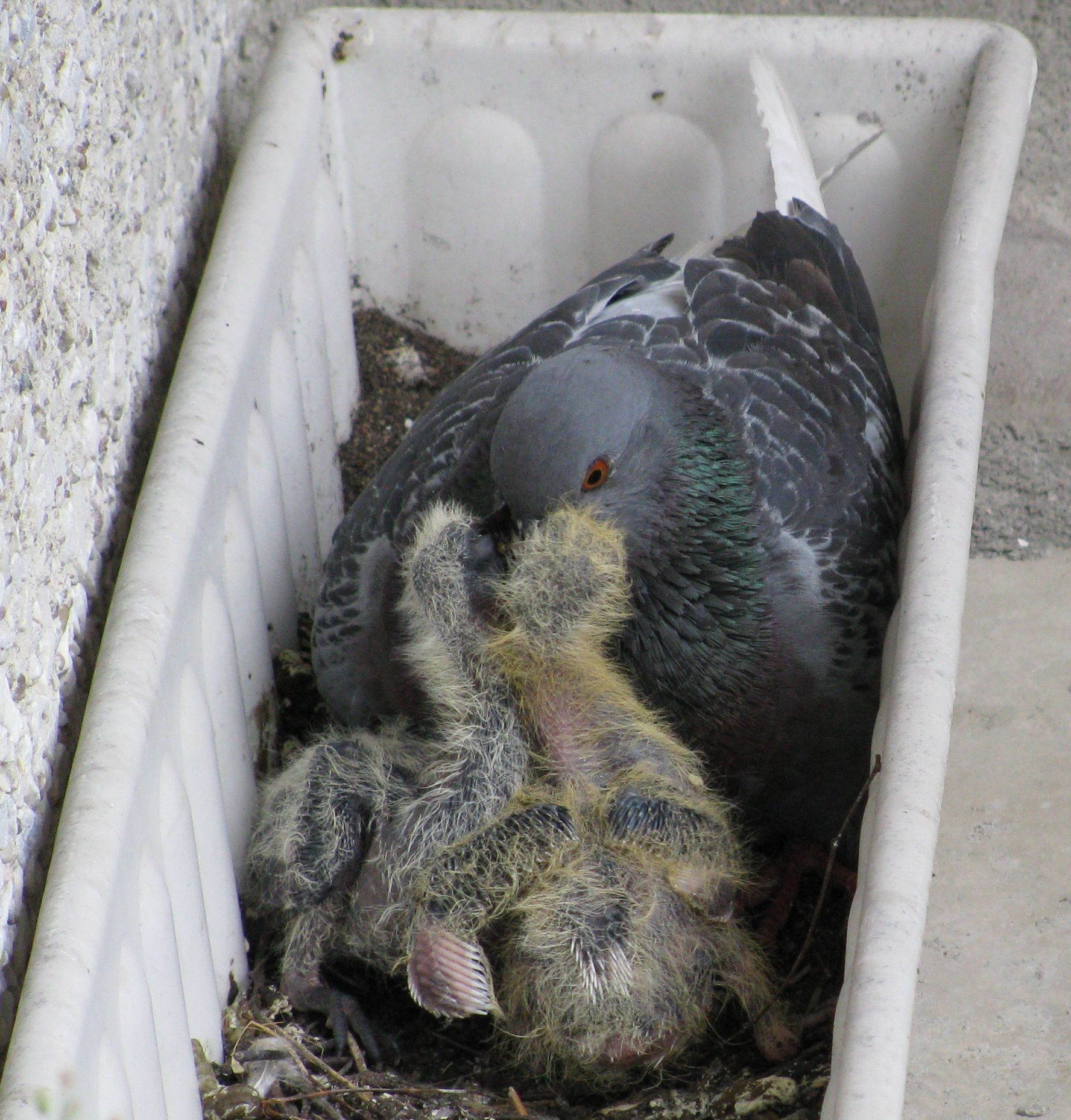
A feral pigeon feeding squabs in Lithuania.

Crop milk is a secretion from the lining of the crop of parent birds in some species that is regurgitated to young birds. It is found among all pigeons and doves, where it is also referred to as pigeon milk. Crop milk is also secreted from the crop of flamingos and male emperor penguins, suggesting independent evolution of this trait. Unlike in mammals where typically only females produce milk, crop milk is produced by both males and females in pigeons and flamingos, and in penguins, only by the male.

Lactation in birds is controlled by prolactin, which is the same hormone that causes lactation in mammals. Crop milk is a holocrine secretion non-sex specific in response to brooding unlike in mammals where milk is an apocrine secretion. Crop milk contains both fat and protein, as with mammalian milk, but unlike mammalian milk, it contains no carbohydrates.

== Pigeon milk ==
=== Composition ===
Crop milk bears little physical resemblance to mammalian milk, though in pigeons it is compositionally similar. Pigeon milk is a semi-solid substance somewhat like pale yellow cottage cheese. It is extremely high in protein and fat, containing higher levels than cow or human milk. Unlike mammalian milk, which is an emulsion, pigeon crop milk consists of a suspension of protein-rich and fat-rich cells that proliferate and detach from the lining of the crop. Also unlike mammalian milk, the substance does not contain carbohydrates (sugars). It has also been shown to contain anti-oxidants and immune-enhancing factors which contribute to milk immunity. Like mammalian milk, crop milk contains IgA antibodies. It also contains some bacteria. Crop milk has been shown to contain carotenoids such as xanthophylls, which may be important in immunological functions. Crop milk is said to have a "rancid" flavour.

=== Production ===
Crop morphology is highly dynamic, with changes in its histological structure observed between reproductive and non-reproductive periods. Indeed, during breeding periods the crop wall thickens from 0.15 mm to up to 3 mm. Stimulated by prolactin, the crop becomes more vascularized which allows basal cells of the crop to divide more rapidly. As new cells divide in the basal layer, previously formed cells differentiate and accumulate lipid droplets as they are progressively displaced towards the luminal surface. Eventually, these differentiated cells rich in lipids and nutrients slough off into the crop cavity, forming a secretion that is fed directly to squabs.

=== Feeding behavior ===
Columbidae are altricial birds, and their young (squabs) must be fed crop milk, as they are unable to digest seeds or grains. Pigeon's milk begins to be produced a couple of days before the eggs are due to hatch. The parents may cease to eat at this point to be able to provide the squabs with crop milk uncontaminated by seeds. The squabs are fed on pure crop milk for the first week or so of life. After this the parents begin to introduce a proportion of adult food, softened by spending time in the moist conditions of the adult crop, into the mix fed to the squabs, until by the end of the second week they are being fed entirely on softened adult food. This diet promotes their rapid growth, with their body weight doubling within the first two days after birth.

Pigeons normally lay two eggs. If one egg fails to hatch, the surviving squab gets the advantage of a supply of crop milk sufficient for two squabs and grows at a significantly faster rate. Research suggests that a pair of breeding pigeons cannot produce enough crop milk to feed three squabs adequately, which explains why clutches are limited to two.

== Other birds ==
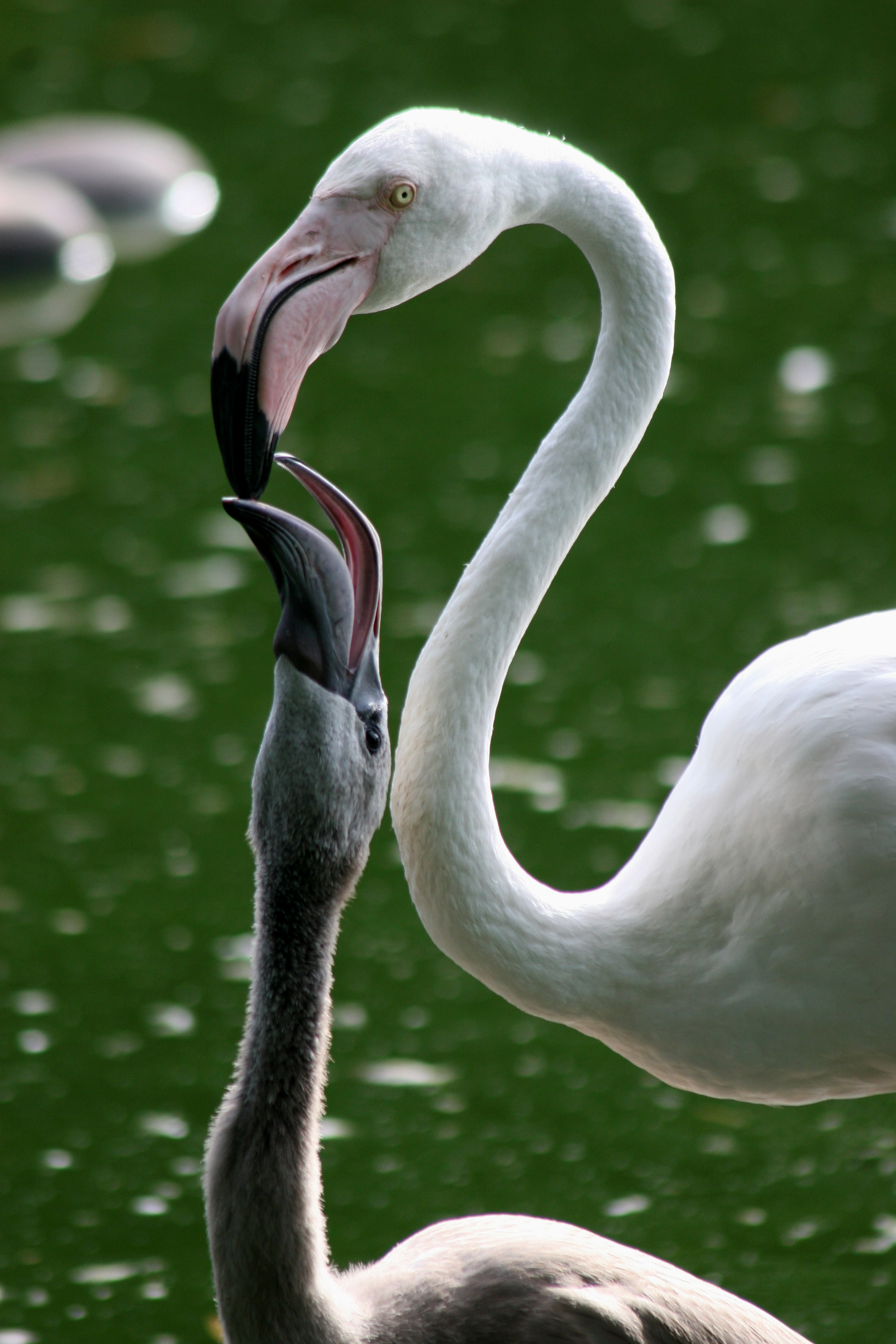
A greater flamingo chick in Zoo Basel is fed crop milk

Crop milk evolved independently in flamingos and the male emperor penguin. In flamingos, crop milk produced in the first weeks is a bright red, relatively thin liquid. Though it resembles blood in colour, it contains no red blood cells; the red colour is from the presence of canthaxanthin. After the first few weeks, the colour fades gradually; flamingos can produce crop milk for up to the first 6 months of their young's life.
