= Growth Factors (journal) =

- Discipline: Cell and molecular biology
- Language: English
- Edited by: Steven Stacker

Publication details
- History: 1989-present
- Publisher: Informa Healthcare
- Frequency: Bimonthly

Standard abbreviations
- ISO 4: Growth Factors

Indexing
- ISSN: 0897-7194 (print); 1029-2292 (web)

Links
- Journal homepage

Growth Factors is a bimonthly peer-reviewed scientific journal that covers research on the control of cell production and differentiation and survival. It is published by Informa Healthcare. The editor-in-chief is Steven Stacker (Peter MacCallum Cancer Centre).
