= Lymantria dispar in the United States =

Spread of an invasive species

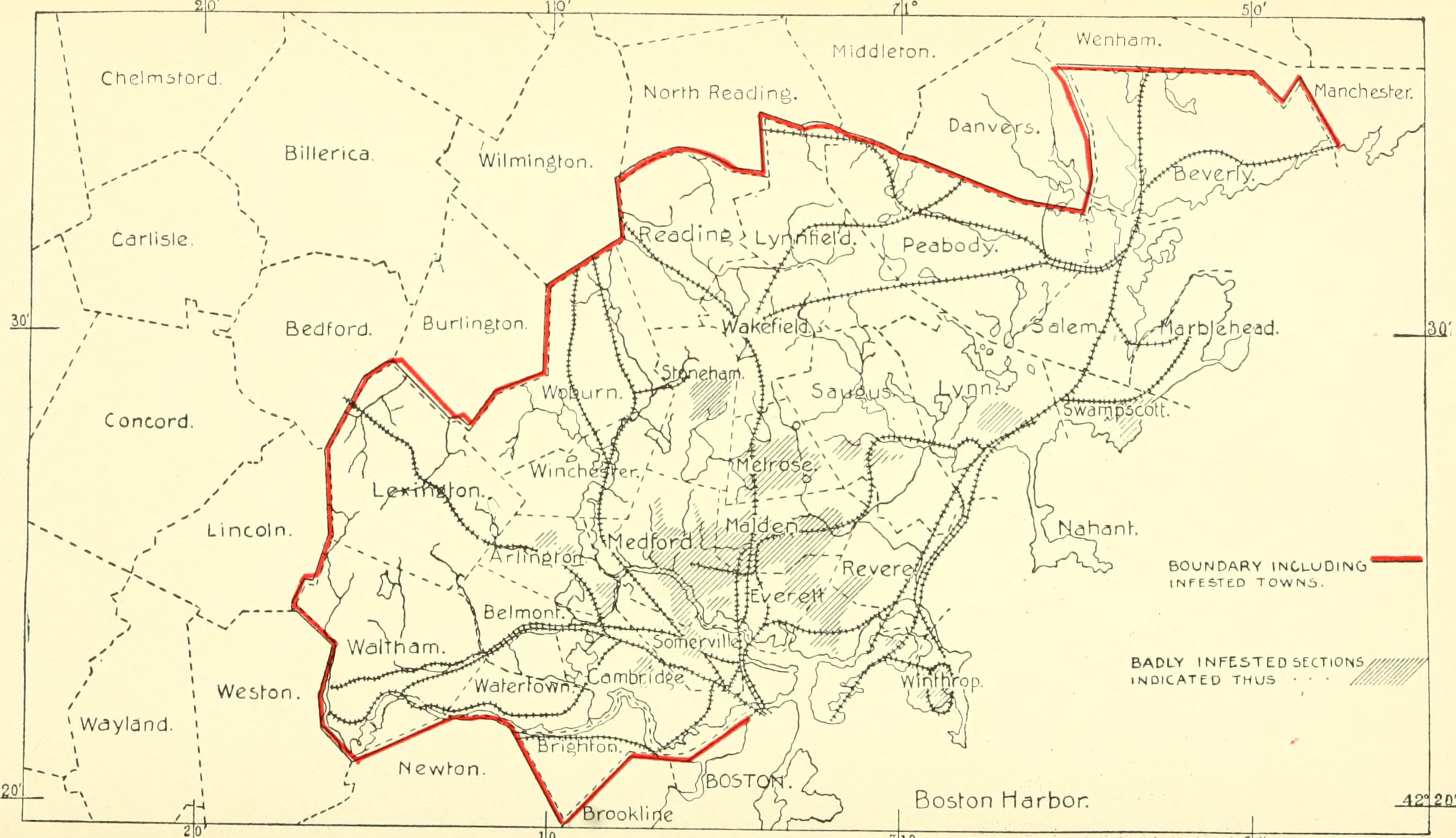
First occurrence around Medford, Massachusetts (1888)

Progressive spread of the gypsy moth (L. dispar) across north east US from 1900 to 2007; compiled from county data by US Forest Service

In 1868, Étienne Léopold Trouvelot, a French scientist living in Medford, Massachusetts, introduced into the United States the gypsy moth (Lymantria dispar), which is now also termed the "spongy moth" within that nation. Because native silk-spinning caterpillars were susceptible to disease, Trouvelot imported the species in order to breed a more resistant hybrid species. Some of the moths escaped, found suitable habitat, and began breeding. The gypsy moth is now a major pest of hardwood trees in the Eastern United States.

The first US outbreak occurred in 1889 in the New England states. In 1923 attempts were made to prevent the westward spread of the moth by maintaining a barrier zone extending from Canada to Long Island of nearly 27,300 km^{2}. This barrier however broke down by 1939. By 1987, the gypsy moth had established itself throughout the Northeastern United States, southern Quebec, and Ontario. The insect has now spread into Michigan, Minnesota, Virginia, West Virginia, Illinois, and Wisconsin. Small, isolated infestations have sporadically occurred in Utah, Oregon, Washington, California, and British Columbia, but efforts have been taken to eradicate them. As of 2021 the Washington State Department of Agriculture is again trying to eradicate both L. d. d. and L. d. asiatica – using Bacillus thuringiensis kurstaki (Btk) toxin – to prevent their establishment in the state.

Since 1980, the gypsy moth has defoliated over one million acres (4,000 km^{2}) of forest each year. In 1981, 12.9 million acres (52,200 km^{2}) were defoliated. In wooded suburban areas, during periods of infestation, gypsy moth larvae crawl over man-made obstacles and sometimes enter homes. When feeding, they leave behind a mixture of small pieces of leaves and frass, or excrement. During outbreaks, the sound of caterpillars chewing and dropping frass may be loud enough to sound like light to moderate rainfall. Gypsy moth populations usually remain low, but occasional increases to very high levels can result in partial or total defoliation of host trees.

According to a 2011 report, the gypsy moth is now one of the most destructive insects in the Eastern United States. The moth and other foliage-eating pests cause an estimated $868 million in annual damages in the U.S.

In June 2024, Scientific American reported the severity of the outbreak in the northeastern and midwestern regions of the United States. Some places in these regions were experiencing one of the most severe outbreaks ever recorded. Some areas reported densities exceeding 2,500,000 caterpillars per hectare (1,000,000 per acre). Some regions have grappled with this issue for five consecutive years.

== Host species ==
Gypsy moth larvae prefer oak trees, but may feed on many species of trees and shrubs, both hardwood and conifer. In the eastern US, the gypsy moth prefers oaks, aspen, apple, sweetgum, speckled alder, basswood, gray and paper birch, poplar, willow, and hawthorns, amongst other species. The gypsy moth avoids ash trees, tulip-tree, cucumber tree, American sycamore, butternut, black walnut, catalpa, flowering dogwood, balsam fir, cedar, American holly, and mountain laurel and rhododendron shrubs, but will feed on these in late instars when densities are extremely high. Older larvae feed on several species of softwood that younger larvae avoid, including cottonwood, hemlock, Atlantic white cypress, and pine and spruce species native to the east.

== Moth rash ==
The gypsy moth caterpillar has been reported to produce a poison ivy-like rash on some humans coming into contact with the hairs of the larval stage. The contact can be direct or even indirect, if the small hairs are carried by the wind and onto the skin or clothing of a person. Gypsy moth rashes were documented in the early 1980s, during a major infestation in the Northeastern United States. In coastal Maine and Cape Cod, Massachusetts, caterpillar-triggered rash is much more likely due to exposure to the browntail moth (Euproctis chrysorrhoea).

== Effects of defoliation ==
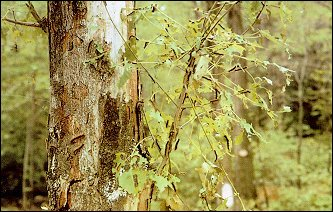
A tree stripped by gypsy moth larvae

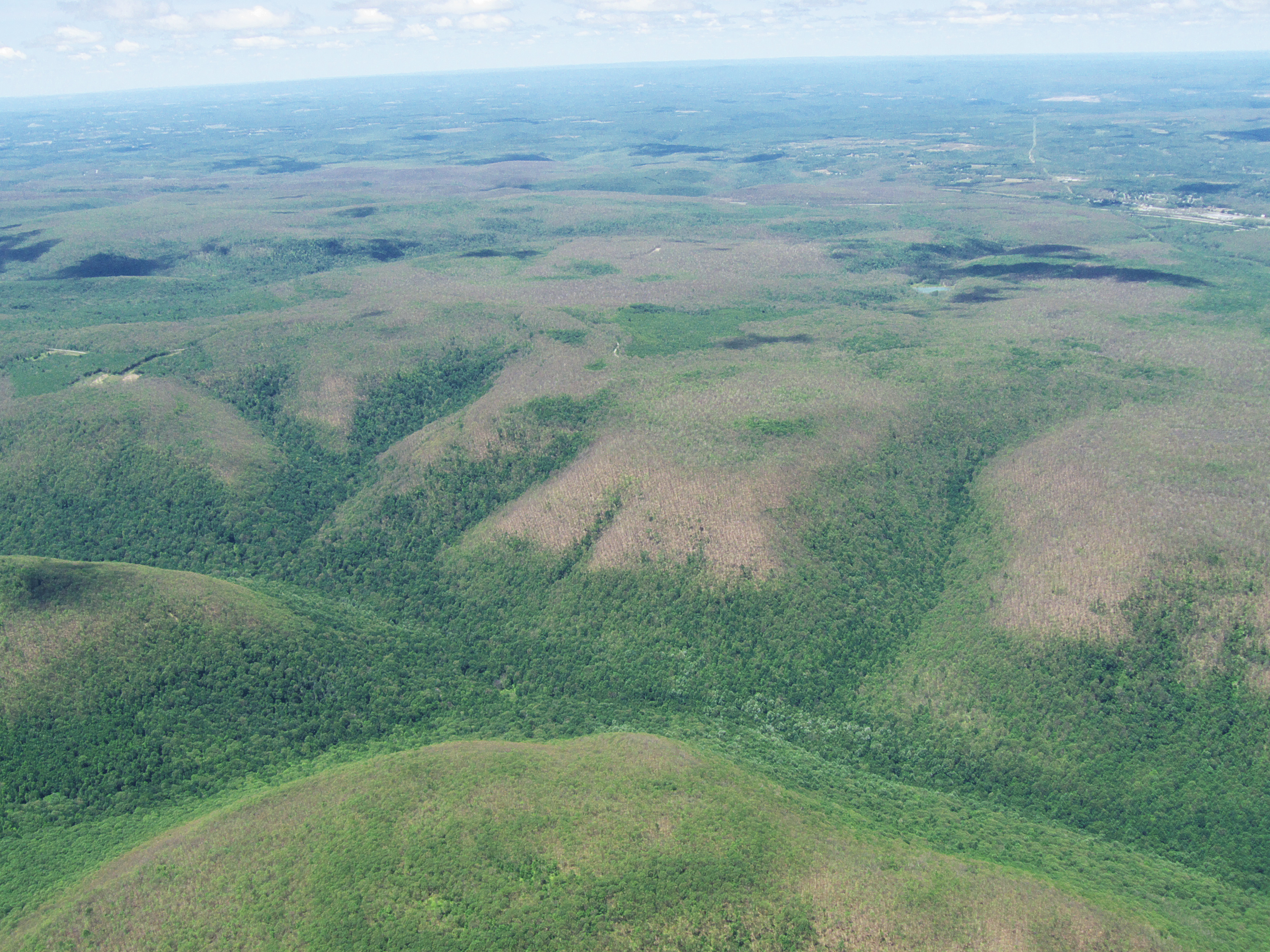
Aerial photo showing gypsy moth defoliation of hardwood trees along the Allegheny Front near Snow Shoe, Pennsylvania, in July 2007. The light green patches on hilltops are trees that had begun growing new leaves by the time this picture was taken.

The effects of defoliation depend on the species of tree, amount of foliage removed, health of the tree, number of consecutive periods of defoliation, and available soil moisture. If less than half of the crown is defoliated, most hardwood species will experience only a slight reduction in radial growth. If more than half of the crown is defoliated, most hardwoods will produce a second flush of foliage by midsummer. Healthy trees can usually withstand one or two consecutive major defoliation events. Trees weakened by previous defoliation or subjected to other stresses like droughts are frequently killed after a single half-defoliation.

Trees use their energy reserves during re-foliation and may become weakened and exhibit symptoms such as the death of twigs and branches in the upper crown and sprouting of old buds on the trunk and larger branches. Weakened trees experience radial growth reduction of approximately 30 to 50 percent. Weakened trees are vulnerable to attack by disease organisms and other insects, or example, the Armillaria fungus may attack the roots, and the two-lined chestnut borer may attack the trunk and branches. Affected trees will eventually die two or three years after they are attacked by these pests.

Although not preferred by the larvae, pines and hemlocks are subject to heavy defoliation during gypsy moth outbreaks and are more likely to be killed than hardwoods. A complete defoliation can kill approximately half of pine species and 90 percent of mature hemlocks because conifers do not store energy in their roots; an exception is larch.

== Factors that affect gypsy moth populations ==
Natural predators play an important role during periods of low population. Predators include wasps, flies, ground beetles, ants, many species of spider, several species of birds such as chickadees, blue jays, nuthatches, towhees, and robins, and approximately 15 species of common woodland mammals such as the white-footed mouse, various shrews, chipmunks, squirrels, and raccoons. Small mammals are the largest predators in low density gypsy moth populations and are apparently critical in preventing outbreaks. Calosoma (ground beetles of European origin), cuckoos, and flocking birds such as starlings, grackles, and red-winged blackbirds, are attracted to infested areas in high gypsy moth population years.

=== Biological control ===
Diseases caused by bacteria, fungi, or viruses contribute to the decline of gypsy moth populations, especially during periods when populations are dense and are stressed by a lack of preferred foliage. Wilt disease caused by a particular nucleopolyhedrovirus (LdNPV) that is specific to the gypsy moth is its most devastating natural disease, causing a dramatic collapse of outbreak populations by killing both the larvae and pupae. Larvae infected with wilt disease are shiny and hang limply in an inverted "V" position. Infection with NPV is the most common source of mortality in high density populations and NPV epizootics usually cause the collapse of populations.

Introduced through 1910 and 1911, the fungus Entomophaga maimaiga only started to have a large impact on gypsy moth populations in North America in 1989.

Weather conditions can affect the survival and development of gypsy moth life stages, regardless of population density. Temperatures of −20 °F (−29 °C.) lasting from 48 to 72 hours can kill exposed eggs; alternate periods of freezing and thaw in late winter and early spring may prevent eggs from hatching; and cold, rainy weather inhibits dispersal and feeding and slows the growth of newly hatched larvae.

Gypsy moth larvae have several predators which can help decrease their population. Lack of predation is one reason they can change from being a normal part of the ecosystem to an actual threat to trees. Among their predators are:

- deer mice – are considered the most important predator of low-density gypsy moth populations and their abundance may be critical in determining whether populations go into an outbreak mode. Their abundance is strongly affected by the amount of mast (e.g., acorns) in the previous year.
- tachinid flies – parasitize gypsy moth populations. While they may become quite abundant during a gypsy moth outbreak, they apparently have little effect on the population dynamics.
- braconid wasps – also parasitize gypsy moths but play a minor role in their dynamics.

The effectiveness of releasing or enhancing gypsy moth predators or parasites to control the moth is "difficult to determine", as rates of parasitism vary with the density of gypsy moth larvae, the range of alternate hosts for the parasite used, and the weather. Both in North America and in Europe, research continues into biological control of the species, and for example the Baculoviridae viruses show potential for control.

== Management ==
Several methods of managing the gypsy moth are used; these include the monitoring of populations, maintaining the health and vigor of trees, concentrating and killing caterpillars, removing egg masses and treating with insecticides to kill larvae and protecting tree foliage. To concentrate the caterpillars, a strip of dark cloth about 12 inches wide – for example, burlap or old blue jeans, is tied around the tree at eye height. A string is tied around the cloth at its midpoint to create a fold of cloth around the tree. At mid-morning or later, the bands of cloth are checked for caterpillars, which are killed.

The egg masses – 3/4-inch-long ovals that look like tan felt or velour – will be present from late July until May when they hatch. The egg masses are scraped off the tree and burnt or dumped in the trash. If they remain on the ground, the eggs will still be viable. Tactics suggested for homeowners may be too costly and labor-intensive for managers to use in forest stands.

The gypsy moth currently occupies less than a third of its potential range in North America, and considerable resources are directed at minimizing its expansion into these areas. Every year, over 100,000 pheromone traps are placed in uninfested areas in order to detect new infestations that occasionally arise when people inadvertently transport life stages into uninfested areas (for example, egg masses on recreational vehicles). When captures are positive for several consecutive years, this indicates that a population is establishing and these are eradicated, usually via the application of the bacterial pesticide Bacillus thuringiensis ('Bt').

In 2008 California agriculture officials quarantined a rural 5-square-mile (13 km^{2}) section of Ventura County near Ojai to prevent the spread of a newly found gypsy moth colony.

=== Pesticides ===
The decision to use pesticides is influenced by a number of factors, such as the quantity of visible egg masses, The percentage of preferred hosts, presence of dead or dying branches, and proximity to heavily infested woodlands. When numbers of gypsy moth larvae are high, pesticides may be the most effective method of killing larvae.

Available pesticides fall into two groups: microbial or biological and chemical (table 1). Microbial and biological pesticides contain living organisms that must be consumed by the pest. These include bacteria, viruses, and other organisms; biologicals include man-made synthetics of naturally occurring organisms. These pesticides are applied before the larvae reach the third stage of development. As they mature, larvae develop resistance to microbial pesticides. Low dose pheromone systems are used in Jersey, Channel Islands, to flood areas with synthetic pheromone and effectively 'blind' males so they are unable to locate females.

Nucleopolyhedrovirus (NPV), a naturally occurring organism, has been developed as a microbial pesticide. It is presently registered under the name Gypchek and is available for use in USDA Forest Service sponsored suppression programs. NPV and Gypcheck are specific to the gypsy moth.

Bacillus thuringiensis is microbial and biological. It is the most commonly used pesticide and is used against other pests, including the western spruce budworm and other Choristoneura and the tent caterpillar. When Bt is taken internally, the insect is paralyzed, stops feeding, and dies of starvation or disease.

Chemical pesticides are contact poisons and stomach poisons. The timing of application is less critical than that of microbials and biologicals. Chemical pesticides can affect non-target organisms and may be hazardous to human health.

Table 1 – Microbial and chemical pesticides used to control gypsy moth Source:
Active ingredient	Representative trade names	Comments
Bacillus thuringiensis	Foray	Registered for aerial and ground application. Available under various trade names. Toxic to other moth and butterfly larvae. Can be used safely near water.
Acephate	Orthene	Registered for aerial and ground application. Available under various trade names. Toxic to bees and some gypsy moth parasites. Often used from the ground to treat individual trees.
Carbaryl	Sevin	Registered for aerial and ground application. Available under various trade names. Toxic to bees and gypsy moth parasites. Once the most widely used chemical in control programs.
Diflubenzuron	Dimilin	A restricted-use pesticide that can be applied only by certified applicators.

The most commonly used chemical pesticides currently registered with the US Environmental Protection Agency (EPA) for use against the gypsy moth contain carbaryl, diflubenzuron, or acephate. Malathion, methoxychlor, phosmet, trichlorfon, and synthetic pyrethroids (permethrin) are also registered with the EPA, but are used infrequently.

Several studies by Peter G. Kevan et al of the University of Guelph conducted from 1975 to 1995 showed serious reduction in pollination of blueberry and other crops due to aerial applications of insecticides that killed non-target wild bees. Diflubenzuron is an insect growth regulator and interferes with the normal molting process of the larvae but does not affect adult insects. Aquatic crustaceans and immature, non-target insects that undergo stages of molting are often sensitive to this pesticide.

=== Mating disruption ===
Mating disruption of the gypsy moth, when used appropriately, effectively manages insect pest at different infestation levels. It can also be used alone or as a complement to other management methods like the use of conventional pesticides. Specifically, management of pests using mating disruption involves the use of synthetically created, chemically identical semiochemicals, in this case the species sex pheromone, that disrupt the mating behavior of the pest (most of the targeted pests belong to Lepidoptera and Coleoptera). Gypsy moth, Lymantria dispar, virgin females emit sex pheromones that attract males, and mating ensues. By applying a large number of point sources that continuously emit naturally identical gypsy moth sex pheromones, or disparlure, male moths end up spending most of their time manipulating these point sources, and thus have a significantly difficult time locating female moths, wasting time and effort following false pheromone trails. This effectively reduces the number of mating encounters between adult moths.

Mating disruption has been successfully and safely used to manage gypsy moth in a number of eastern US states stretching from Wisconsin to North Carolina under the federal Slow the Spread (STS) program. Because mating disruption uses an insect's nature identical sex pheromone to disrupt their mating, mating disruption products are species-specific and do not impact other organisms and beneficial insects such as natural predators and pollinators. Hence they can be used as an alternative or complement to other control solutions, such as for the purpose of minimizing the negative effects of wide spectrum insecticides on non-target species and insecticide resistance build-up. Only two mating disruption products have been approved through the USDA Forest Services for use in the STS program: Hercon Disrupt and ISCA Technologies's SPLAT GM. These mating disruption products are formulated with the gypsy moth sex pheromone and have been aerially applied to millions of acres since the early 1990s, which has successfully slowed the spread of the gypsy moth from the northeastern United States to the rest of the continent. SPLAT GM is also packaged and sold in handheld dispensers for manual application to smaller areas of 2.5 acres or more, and can be used as an alternative or complement to other gypsy moth control solutions.

== See also ==
- Lymantria dispar
- Lymantria dispar dispar
- Gypsy moths in New Zealand
- Invasive species in the United States
- Environmental issues in the United States
