= Cyrtophleba ornata =

Scientific classification
- Kingdom: Animalia
- Phylum: Arthropoda
- Class: Insecta
- Order: Diptera
- Family: Tachinidae
- Genus: Cyrtophloeba
- Species: C. ornata

Binomial name
- Cyrtophloeba ornata (Aldrich, 1926)

Synonyms
- Opsophagus ornatus Aldrich, 1926

Species of fly

Cyrtophloeba ornata is a species of fly in the family Tachinidae.

== Distribution ==
Peru.
