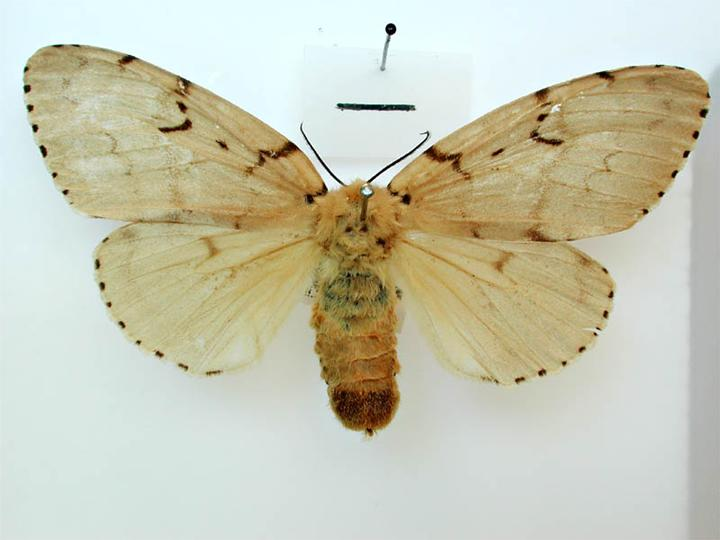
- Female
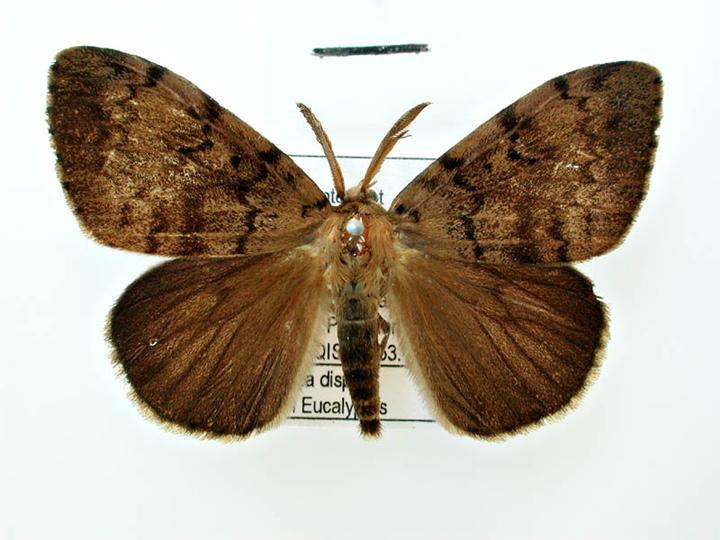
- Male

Scientific classification
- Domain: Eukaryota
- Kingdom: Animalia
- Phylum: Arthropoda
- Class: Insecta
- Order: Lepidoptera
- Superfamily: Noctuoidea
- Family: Erebidae
- Genus: Lymantria
- Species: L. dispar
- Subspecies: L. d. japonica

Trinomial name
- Lymantria dispar japonica Motschulsky, 1860

= Lymantria dispar japonica =

Species of moth

Lymantria dispar japonica, also known as the Japanese gypsy moth, is a moth in the family Erebidae of Eurasian origin.

== Taxonomy ==
Lymantria dispar japonica was originally described as a variation of Lymantria dispar by Victor Motschulsky in 1860. It was treated as a full species by Kirby in 1892 and Swinhoe in 1903. Strand in 1911 and again in 1923 treated L. d. japonica as a subspecies of L. dispar, since then other authors (Inoue 1957, Schintlmeister 2004) have also recognized the form from Japan as L. d. japonica.

The basis for having L. d. japonica as its own species, separate from Lymrantria dispar, comes from the difference in size and the partial incompatibility between crosses of L. d. dispar and L. d. japonica.

In December 2022, the U.S. Department of Agriculture replaced the term "Asian gypsy moth," used to refer to L. d. japonica and related species of Eurasian origin, with "flighted spongy moth complex," whose members include L. d. japonica, L. d. asiatica, L. albescens, L. umbrosa and L. postalba, for official use by the Animal and Plant Health Inspection Service.

== Range ==
Found in Japan on all four major islands, Honshu, Shikoku, Kyushu and parts of southern and western Hokkaido.

== Oviposition ==
Eggs are similar to Lymantria dispar dispar; they range from yellow to a dark brown or chocolate brown. The location of eggs varies by region. In the Tonko region of Honshu, eggs are commonly laid on white birch trees. In the Nara prefecture, eggs are commonly laid high up in the trees, while in the Gumma prefecture, eggs are typically laid within 60 cm from the ground. On a larch plantation in Tamayama, Iwate Prefecture, eggs were commonly laid below 1 m on the trunk of the tree in positions of low illumination and lower temperatures.
