= C11H22O =

The molecular formula C_{11}H_{22}O (molar mass: 170.29 g/mol, exact mass: 170.1671 u) may refer to:

- Undecanal, also known as undecyl aldehyde
- 2-Undecanone, also known as IBI-246 or methyl nonyl ketone
