= OR2T4 =

Protein-coding gene in humans

Identifiers
- Aliases: OR2T4, OR1-60, OR2T4Q, olfactory receptor family 2 subfamily T member 4
- External IDs: MGI: 3030058; GeneCards: OR2T4

Gene location (Human)
Chr.	Chromosome 1 (human)
Band	1q44	Start	248,361,665 bp
Band	1q44	End	248,362,627 bp

Gene location (Mouse)
Chr.	Chromosome 11 (mouse)
Band	11|11 B1.3	Start	58,456,682 bp
Band	11|11 B1.3	End	58,461,379 bp
RNA expression pattern
Bgee	Human / Mouse (ortholog); Top expressed in: ganglionic eminence; prefrontal cortex; Brodmann area 9; primary visual cortex; substantia nigra / Top expressed in: esophagus; conceptus; placenta; More reference expression data
BioGPS	n/a
Gene ontology
Molecular function	G protein-coupled receptor activity; olfactory receptor activity; signal transducer activity
Cellular component	integral component of membrane; plasma membrane; membrane
Biological process	sensory perception of smell; signal transduction; response to stimulus; detection of chemical stimulus involved in sensory perception of smell; G protein-coupled receptor signaling pathway
Sources:Amigo / QuickGO
Orthologs
Databases	NCBI: entry; OMA: entry
Species	Human	Mouse
Entrez	127074	258198
Ensembl	ENSG00000196944; ENSG00000275617; ENSG00000274870	ENSMUSG00000059279
UniProt	Q8NH00	M9MMJ7
RefSeq (mRNA)	NM_001004696	NM_207695
RefSeq (protein)	NP_001004696	NP_997578
Location (UCSC)	Chr 1: 248.36 – 248.36 Mb	Chr 11: 58.46 – 58.46 Mb
PubMed search
- Wikidata
View/Edit Human	View/Edit Mouse

Olfactory receptor 2T4 is a protein that in humans is encoded by the OR2T4 gene.

Olfactory receptors interact with odorant molecules in the nose, to initiate a neuronal response that triggers the perception of a smell. The olfactory receptor proteins are members of a large family of G-protein-coupled receptors (GPCR) arising from single coding-exon genes. Olfactory receptors share a 7-transmembrane domain structure with many neurotransmitter and hormone receptors and are responsible for the recognition and G protein-mediated transduction of odorant signals. The olfactory receptor gene family is the largest in the genome. The nomenclature assigned to the olfactory receptor genes and proteins for this organism is independent of other organisms.

== Ligands ==
OR2T4 has known odorant ligands, many of which have a "floral", "soapy", or "waxy" character, similar to lily of the valley:

- Farnesol
- Lilial
- Undecanal

== See also ==
- Olfactory receptor
