= OR56A4 =

Protein-coding gene in humans

Identifiers
- Aliases: OR56A4, OR11-49, olfactory receptor family 56 subfamily A member 4
- External IDs: MGI: 3030518; GeneCards: OR56A4

Gene location (Human)
Chr.	Chromosome 11 (human)
Band	11p15.4	Start	5,999,445 bp
Band	11p15.4	End	6,006,946 bp

Gene location (Mouse)
Chr.	Chromosome 7 (mouse)
Band	7|7 E3	Start	104,803,899 bp
Band	7|7 E3	End	104,812,860 bp
RNA expression pattern
Bgee	Human / Mouse (ortholog); Top expressed in: testicle / n/a; More reference expression data
BioGPS	n/a
Gene ontology
Molecular function	G protein-coupled receptor activity; olfactory receptor activity; signal transducer activity; adrenergic receptor activity; dopamine neurotransmitter receptor activity, coupled via Gi/Go; dopamine binding
Cellular component	integral component of membrane; plasma membrane; integral component of plasma membrane; membrane; synaptic vesicle membrane
Biological process	adenylate cyclase-activating adrenergic receptor signaling pathway; sensory perception of smell; detection of chemical stimulus involved in sensory perception of smell; signal transduction; response to stimulus; synaptic transmission, dopaminergic; negative regulation of adenylate cyclase activity; adenylate cyclase-inhibiting dopamine receptor signaling pathway; response to toxic substance; regulation of dopamine secretion; regulation of potassium ion transport; behavioral response to cocaine; behavioral response to ethanol; negative regulation of cytosolic calcium ion concentration; negative regulation of synaptic transmission, glutamatergic; phospholipase C-activating dopamine receptor signaling pathway; negative regulation of voltage-gated calcium channel activity; G protein-coupled receptor signaling pathway; adrenergic receptor signaling pathway; adenylate cyclase-modulating G protein-coupled receptor signaling pathway
Sources:Amigo / QuickGO
Orthologs
Databases	NCBI: entry; OMA: entry
Species	Human	Mouse
Entrez	120793	244187
Ensembl	ENSG00000183389	ENSMUSG00000047225
UniProt	Q8NGH8	Q7TRN8
RefSeq (mRNA)	NM_001005179	NM_207249
RefSeq (protein)	NP_001005179	NP_997132
Location (UCSC)	Chr 11: 6 – 6.01 Mb	Chr 7: 104.8 – 104.81 Mb
PubMed search
- Wikidata
View/Edit Human	View/Edit Mouse

Olfactory receptor 56A4 is a protein that in humans is encoded by the OR56A4 gene.

Olfactory receptors interact with odorant molecules in the nose, to initiate a neuronal response that triggers the perception of a smell. The olfactory receptor proteins are members of a large family of G-protein-coupled receptors (GPCR) arising from single coding-exon genes. Olfactory receptors share a 7-transmembrane domain structure with many neurotransmitter and hormone receptors and are responsible for the recognition and G protein-mediated transduction of odorant signals. The olfactory receptor gene family is the largest in the genome. The nomenclature assigned to the olfactory receptor genes and proteins for this organism is independent of other organisms.

== Ligands ==
- Decanal
- Undecanal

== See also ==
- Olfactory receptor
