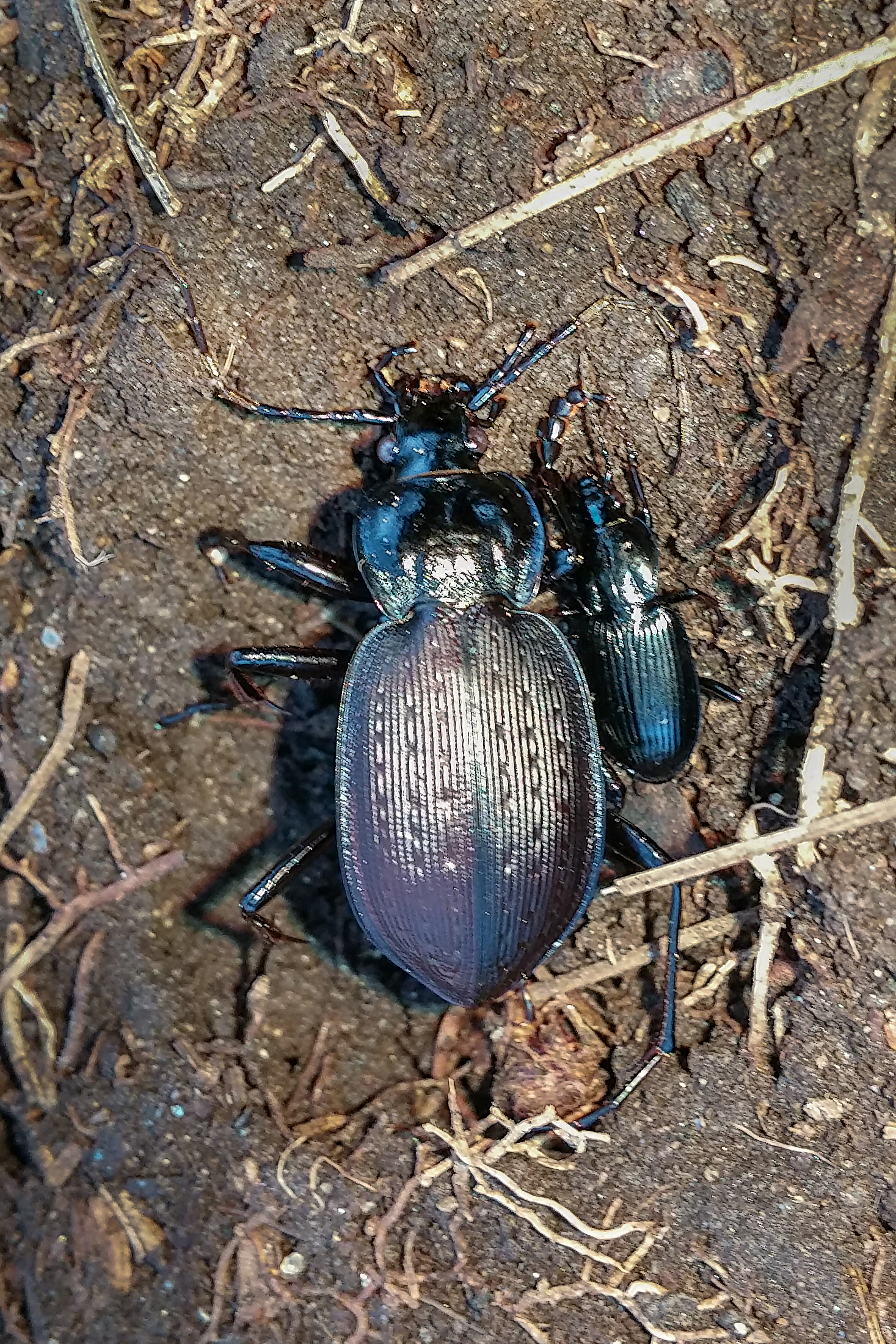
- Carabus goryi

Scientific classification
- Kingdom: Animalia
- Phylum: Arthropoda
- Class: Insecta
- Order: Coleoptera
- Suborder: Adephaga
- Family: Carabidae
- Genus: Carabus
- Species: C. goryi

Binomial name
- Carabus goryi Dejean, 1831

Synonyms
- Carabus clarkei Blumenthal, 1958; Carabus limbatus Say, 1823

= Carabus goryi =

Species of beetle

Carabus goryi, Gory's worm and slug hunter, is a species of ground beetle in the family Carabidae. It is found in North America (Ontario, Alabama, Connecticut, District of Columbia, Georgia, Iowa, Illinois, Indiana, Kentucky, Massachusetts, Maryland, Michigan, Minnesota, Mississippi, North Carolina, New Hampshire, New Jersey, New York, Ohio, Pennsylvania, Rhode Island, South Carolina, Tennessee, Virginia, Vermont, Wisconsin, West Virginia), where it inhabits cool moist forests, orchards and cultivated fields.

Adults are brachypterous, gregarious and nocturnal. They prey on the larvae of Lymantria dispar and various soft bodied insect larvae.
