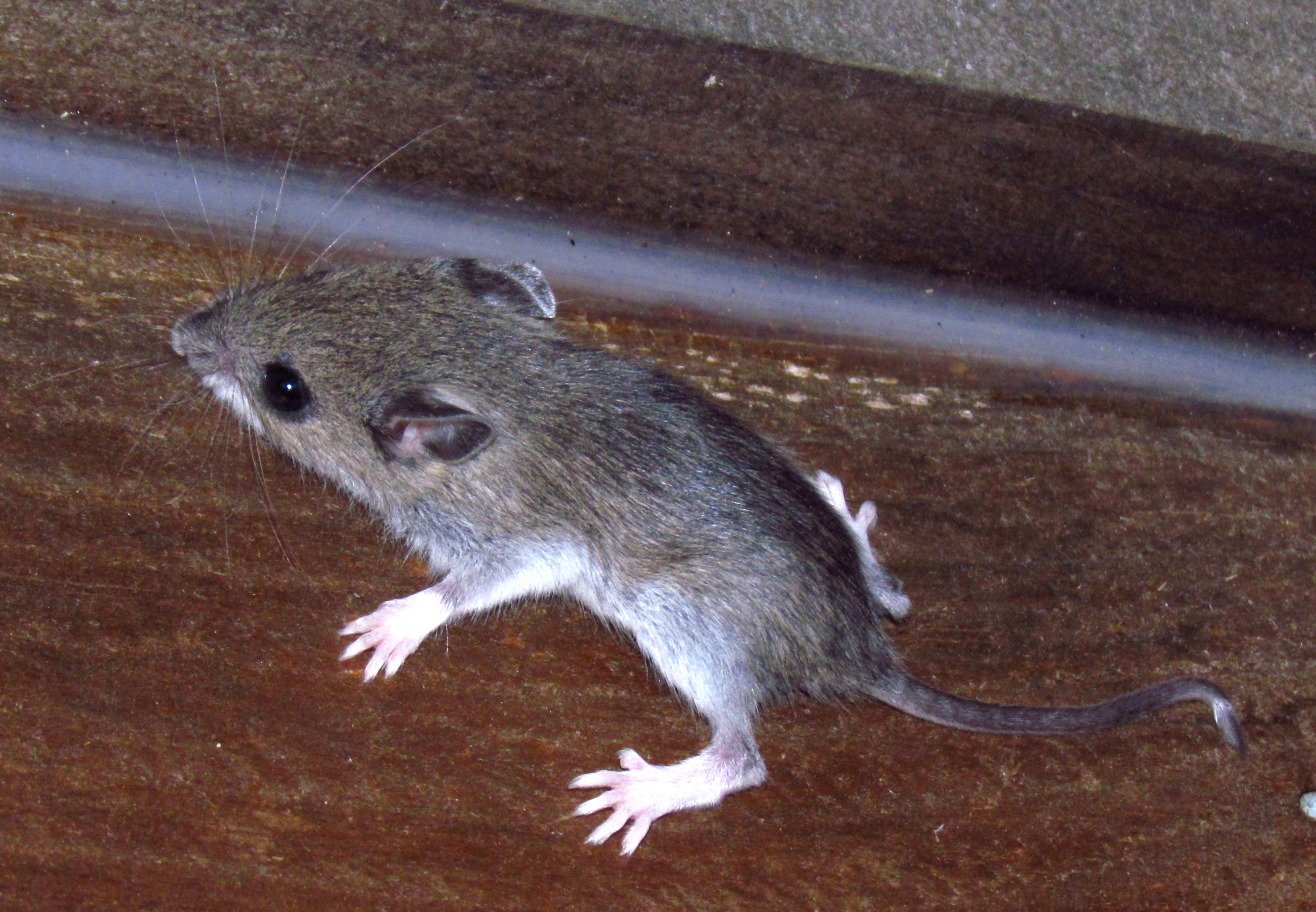

Conservation status
- Least Concern (IUCN 3.1)

Scientific classification
- Kingdom: Animalia
- Phylum: Chordata
- Class: Mammalia
- Order: Rodentia
- Family: Cricetidae
- Subfamily: Neotominae
- Genus: Peromyscus
- Species: P. leucopus

Binomial name
- Peromyscus leucopus (Rafinesque, 1818)

= White-footed mouse =

Species of mammal

The white-footed mouse (Peromyscus leucopus) is a rodent native to North America from southern Canada to the Southwestern United States and Mexico. It is a species of the genus Peromyscus, a closely related group of New World mice often called "deermice". In the Maritimes, its only location is a disjunct population in southern Nova Scotia. It is also erroneously known as the woodmouse, a name which instead describes the unrelated Apodemus sylvaticus, particularly in Texas.

== Description ==
Adults are 90–100 mm (3.5–3.9 in) in length, not counting the tail, which can add another 63–97 mm (2.5–3.8 in). A young adult weighs 20–30 g (0.7–1.1 oz). While their maximum lifespan is 96 months, the mean life expectancy for the species is 45.5 months for females and 47.5 for males. In northern climates, the average life expectancy is 12–24 months. The species is similar to the eastern deer mouse (P. maniculatus).

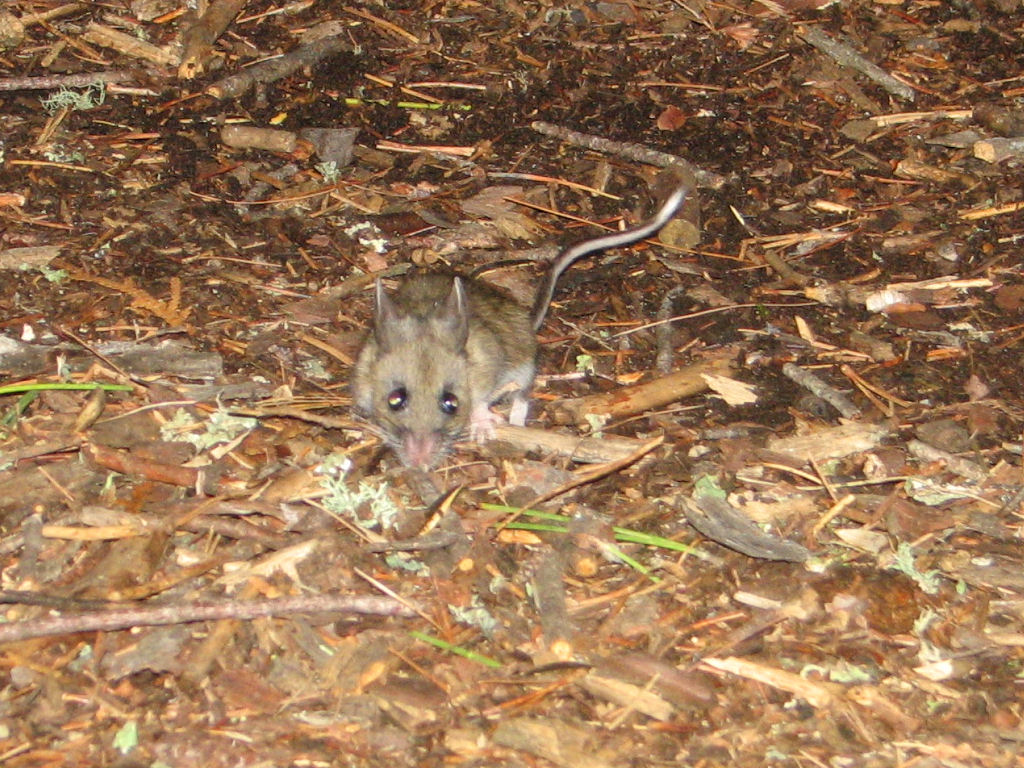
In Quetico Provincial Park, Ontario

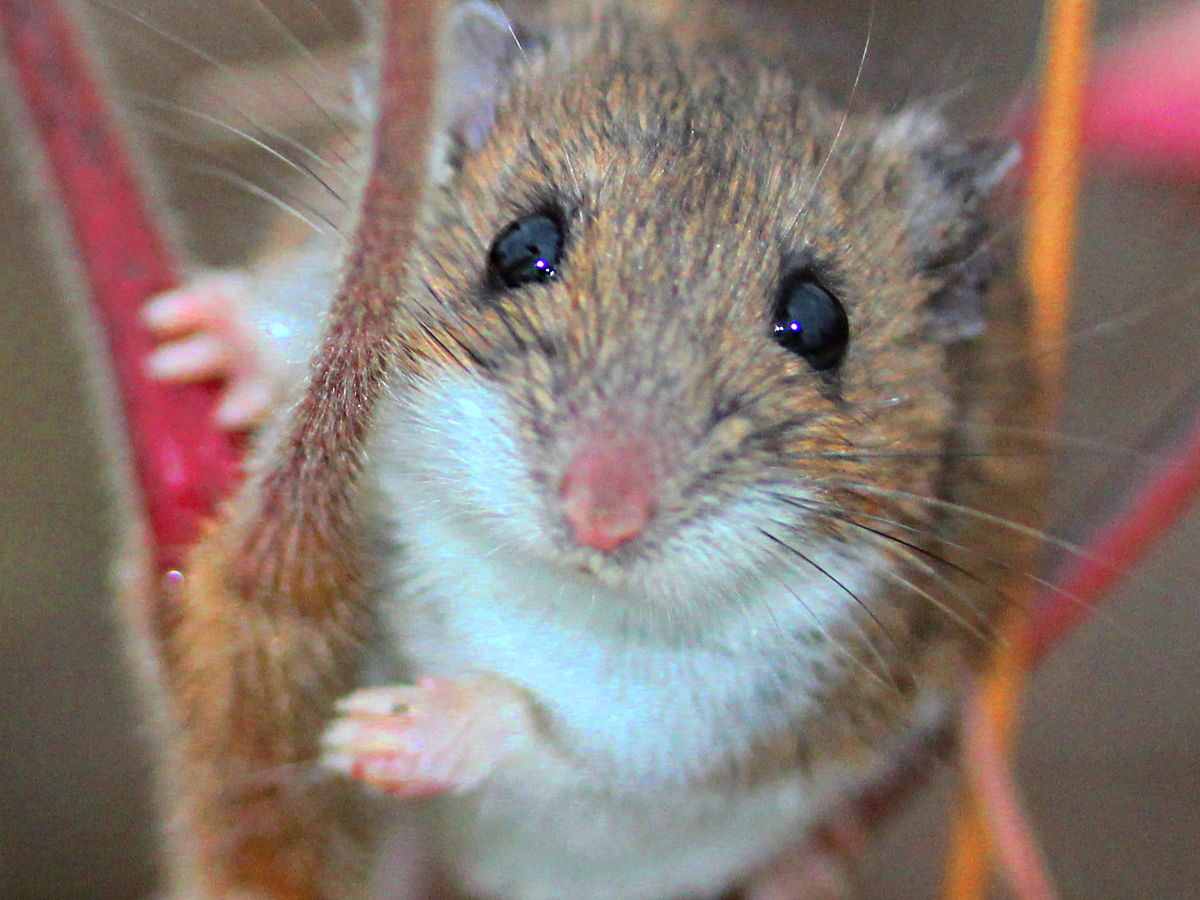
Female on a staghorn sumac

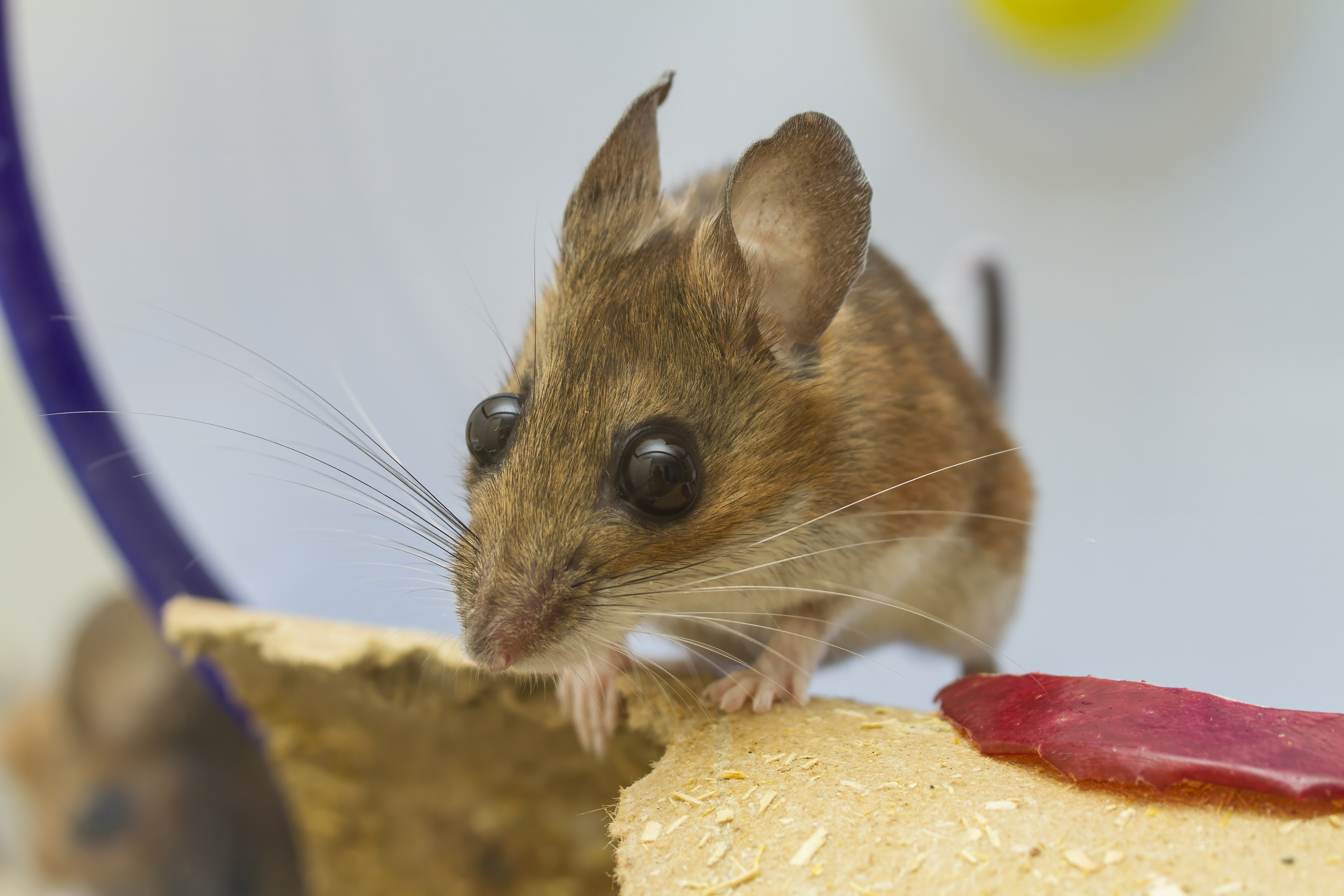
A captive female, at least 3 years and 8 months old

== Behavior and diet ==
White-footed mice are omnivorous, and eat seeds and insects. They are particularly voracious predators of the pupal stage of the invasive gypsy moth (also termed the spongy moth). They are timid and generally avoid humans, but they occasionally take up residence in ground-floor walls of homes and apartments, where they build nests and store food. White-footed mice spend substantial time in trees and bushes, sometimes taking unoccupied old bird nests and building roofs on them.

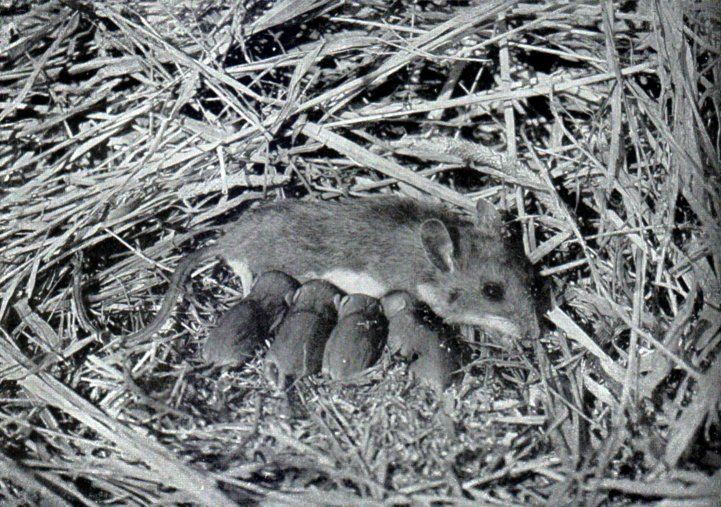
Female with sucklings

== Diseases ==
Like the eastern deer mouse, this species may carry hantaviruses, which can cause severe illness in humans. It has also been found to be a competent reservoir for the Lyme disease–causing spirochete, Borrelia burgdorferi. The white-footed mouse is the favored host for the parasitic botfly Cuterebra fontinella.

== Interactions with humans ==
The white-footed mouse is one of the most common mouse species used as laboratory mice after the house mouse, and their domesticated version is called Peromyscus leucopus linville. Such domesticated mice are also kept as pets and have been bred to have many different colors.

== Adaptations to urbanization in New York City ==
Native populations of P. leucopus in New York City are isolated by dense human infrastructure and are largely confined to small urban forest islands such as Prospect Park and Central Park. The limited gene flow caused by human activities and coupled with a bottleneck event in urban populations has been powerful enough to lead to evolutionary divergence of urban white-footed mice.

=== Metabolism ===
New York City (NYC) mice exhibit local adaptations to diet-mediated selective pressures of urban habitats. Being opportunistic feeders, urban P. leucopus populations subsist on food discarded by humans as a readily available source of nutrition, thereby consuming a lot more fat and carbohydrates than rural populations. Results of a landscape genomics study showed evidence of positive selection in mitochondrial genes of urban mice that are responsible for lipid and carbohydrate breakdown and digestion. Isolated P. leucopus populations inhabiting NYC parks show signs of molecular-level adaptation to urban food resources. The differential evolution of metabolic processes in urban P. leucopus populations is thought to contribute to their success and survival in NYC urban forests. Furthermore, the morphology of urban white-footed mice may be changing to adapt to alternative food sources. For instance, the teeth of white-footed mice in the city are shorter than the teeth of rural mice. This change in physical traits could be explained by the availability of higher-energy food sources in urban forests, which negates the need for long, powerful teeth.

=== Detoxification ===
Urban populations of P. leucopus may be under unique selective pressures due to increased routine exposure to pollutants and toxins. A comparative transcriptome study found evidence of positive selection acting on the genes of urban mice that play major roles in detoxification and xenobiotic metabolism. The genes under positive selection pressure include CYP1A1 and Hsp90, which are involved in the metabolism of foreign substances and drugs. High concentrations of heavy metals such as lead and mercury in NYC park soils pose a unique selective pressure that likely led urban populations of P. leucopus to develop metabolic adaptations to the toxicity of urban forest environments. Furthermore, exposure of pollutants is known to induce hypermethylation of DNA. In urban white-footed mice, a gene coding for a demethylase enzyme is under positive selection. This means that urban populations of white-footed mice that live in highly polluted environments uniquely benefit from an active demethylase enzyme that removes methyl groups from DNA.

=== Reproduction ===
City-dwelling white-footed mouse populations are densely concentrated in isolated urban parks, which makes sperm competition a particularly powerful source of selection in urban environments. Genetic studies have identified signs of molecular-level evolution of reproductive processes in urban white-footed mouse populations. Genes associated with spermatogenesis, sperm locomotion, and sperm–egg interactions in urban mice show a divergent pattern of regulation compared to their rural counterparts. Therefore, the intensified sperm competition of dense mouse populations in urban forests has driven them to develop faster, more efficient sperm than that of rural mice.

=== Immunity ===
Urban environments are saturated with large numbers of novel and familiar pathogens that are introduced by transportation, traffic, and trade. The elevated occurrence of pathogens is a driver of directional selection in which genetic variants that more efficiently resist infection are favored. The outcome of this selection can be seen in genetic divergence between urban and rural P. leucopus populations at loci that regulate the innate immune response and inflammation. Furthermore, a study has found evidence of positive selection acting on genes that modulate pathogen recognition in urban mice. Immunoregulatory proteins that are found on T lymphocytes are overexpressed in urban mice when compared to rural populations. These findings suggest that the immune systems of NYC white-footed mice may be evolving to recognize and respond to pathogens more efficiently. The divergence between rural and urban white-footed mice is especially prominent due to impeded gene flow between these populations, which is caused by landscape barriers including roads, highways, and pedestrian sidewalks. Monitoring the strength of immune defenses in P. leucopus is of special importance because they are commonly infected with dangerous pathogens such as hantaviruses and Borrelia burgdorferi.

== See also ==
- Monongahela virus
