= Cyrtophloeba coquilletti =

Scientific classification
- Kingdom: Animalia
- Phylum: Arthropoda
- Class: Insecta
- Order: Diptera
- Family: Tachinidae
- Genus: Cyrtophloeba
- Species: C. coquilletti

Binomial name
- Cyrtophloeba coquilletti (Aldrich, 1926)

Synonyms
- Cyrtophleba coquilletti Aldrich, 1926

Species of fly

Cyrtophloeba coquilletti is a species of fly in the family Tachinidae. It is a parasitoid of Megalopyge crispata and Epiglaea apiata moths.

== Distribution ==
Canada, United States.
