= Lymantria dispar multicapsid nuclear polyhedrosis virus =

Lymantria dispar multiple nucleopolyhedrovirus

Virus classification
- (unranked): Virus
- Class: Naldaviricetes
- Order: Lefavirales
- Family: Baculoviridae
- Genus: Alphabaculovirus
- Species: Alphabaculovirus lydisparis

Synonyms
- Lymantria dispar multicapsid nuclear polyhedrosis virus; MNPV; Lymantria dispar nucleopolyhedrovirus; Lymantria dispar MNPV

Species of virus

Lymantria dispar multicapsid nuclear polyhedrosis virus or LdMNPV is a viral infection in Lymantria dispar (gypsy moth, also termed spongy moth), that causes infected larvae to die and disintegrate. Infected larvae climb to the top of a tree and die. The larvae then melt or disintegrate, falling onto the foliage below, where they infect more larvae.

Often referred to as Gypchek, the virus goes by multiple names. Gypchek is an insecticide which uses the virus to control the gypsy moth population. Because the virus only infects L. dispar, it has proven safe for use with other insects including ants, bees and non-target lepidopteran species. Studies of its safety have found no toxicity or mortality concerns, though ocular doses administered to rabbits did cause some irritation.

The gene responsible for the behavior of infected larvae has been found to be egt (codes ecdysteroid UDP-glucosyltransferase), with the protein tyrosine phosphatase (PTP) playing a role in the infection of brain tissue. Due to the virus' effect on the infected larvae, various reports of zombie caterpillars popularized the virus at the time of the discovery of the egt gene.

== Virus name ==
Since it was first recorded, LdMNPV has been gone under numerous common names, taxonomical names, and acronyms. It was first reported in 1891 as Wipfelkrankheit, which is German for "treetop disease". This term is also used in English, as is "wilt disease". The term "flacherie", a name that refers to an entirely different disease, was once identified as this virus. Another antiquated term, "caterpillar cholera", was also used early in the 20th century.

The virus has also been referred to as Borralinivirus reprimens.

It has many modern names, including "gypsy moth nucleopolyhedrosis virus", Lymantria dispar MNPV, Lymantria dispar multinucleocapsid nuclear polyhedrosis virus, Lymantria dispar nuclear polyhedrosis virus, Lymantria dispar nucleopolyhedrovirus, and Lymantria disper nuclear polyhedrosis virus, with varying acronyms attached or unattached including LdMNPV, and LdNPV.

Currently, as by taxonomy, the viral species is known as Lymantria dispar multiple nucleopolyhedrovirus.

== Transmission and effects ==
It is transmitted orally, when the larvae ingest material contaminated with the virus. The pathogen invades through the gut wall. It reproduces in the internal tissues, causing disintegration of internal organs and death, within 10–14 days. The host ruptures, distributing viral occlusion bodies into the environment to infect other individuals.

== Effect on population ==
When it is used as a pesticide to control outbreaks, it is referred to as "Gypchek".

=== Behavior changes ===
Unaffected larvae feed at night and hide during the day. The virus instead drives the larva to the canopy of the tree and die. The exact mechanism for how the virus induces the larva to climb to a high vantage point before dying has been linked to a gene in the virus that causes infected cells to produce an enzyme which inactivates the hormone that triggers molting behavior. The molting hormone causes the caterpillar to stop eating, particularly in preparation for molting, and the inactivation of this behavior moderating hormone causes the caterpillar to continue to climb to the canopy where it would feed before the virus destroys the caterpillar's internal organs. The larva liquefies and releases millions of virus particles to spread and infect other moth larvae. Even if it does not reach the top of the tree, the infected larva will migrate to the exposed parts of the plant. Infected larvae are also paler due to the body being filled with viral occlusions. Predators like birds are a source for the spread of the virus. The infected larvae are consumed and the virus is viable after its passage as feces, facilitating its spread.

== Gypchek ==
Gypchek is the registered name of LdMNPV, produced by the U.S. Forest Service. It is produced in vivo in gypsy moth larvae reared under controlled conditions. It was registered in April 1978 with the U.S. Environmental Protection Agency, as an insecticide for aerial and ground use. It was re-registered in 1996 after satisfying the requirements of the EPA. It is used to control very high population densities, i.e. outbreaks. Gypchek is applied by airplane or helicopter.

The U.S. Forest Service studied LdMNPV for its potential use as a microbial insecticide due to a variety of reasons. LdMNPV is naturally occurring and was implicated in population collapse. The virus is environmentally safe and targets the gypsy moth. It is also able to spread the infection and persist. Its use as a direct control agent was proven in the field. Performance of Gypchek was erratic in early formulations, but has been refined.

=== Production ===
LdMNPV cannot be mass-produced. In order to produce Gypchek, a laboratory strain of the gypsy moth is reared and infected with the virus. After the larvae die, they are harvested and processed into a fine powder. It takes between 500 and 1,000 larvae to produce enough Gypchek to treat one acre (1,200 and 2,500/ha).

=== Use ===
Use is limited to pest control programs by government entities. It is applied from the ground or the air. Gypchek is not a contact pesticide, the larvae must consume the virus to become infected. Between 1995 and 2003, Gypchek was applied to 53,034 acres (21,462 ha) total.

=== Safety ===
The virus polyhedrals comprise 12% of Gypchek with larvae body parts and other inert solids making up the remaining 88%. Gypchek's toxicological and pathogenicity testing revealed no effects on laboratory animals, wild mammals, birds, and fish at field doses. While it is non-toxic to warm-blooded animals, impurities may cause eye irritation. The appearance is listed as, "dried insect body parts and virus polyhedral" and has a musty odor. For handlers and mixers, normal clothes, a medical face mask and goggles are recommended. In case of skin contact, wash with soap and water. If in eyes, flush with water. If irritation persists, seek medical attention.

== Toxicity ==
LdMNPV has undergone numerous tests in regards to toxicity and mortality, all of which show no adverse effects except varying irritation for ocular doses administered to the eyes of rabbits. LdMNPV was found to not infect other members of the order Lepidoptera, or Hymenoptera-order insects such as ants and bees.

=== In rats ===
Gypsy moth NPV doses were shown to have no mortality or toxicity in rats. Four studies showed no toxicity or mortality across various doses and processes. One study (Terrell et al. 1976c) which noted decreased weight, noted that the rats used in the test were suffering from overt physical and behavioral changes including the control. Mortality in this study were 3 treated with LdNPV and 8 in the control group. One study (Shope et al. 1975) which showed no toxicity indicated had an antigen response in treated mice. A long-term test also confirmed this. A study into ocular irritation in rats found no irritation after the animals were observed for 21 days. Three inhalation tests found no mortality or toxicity. An inhalation study in sacrificed animals found the persistence of NPV of 95.96% at day 1, 68.0% at day 7 and 8.09% at day 14. One intraperitoneal study found no mortality or adverse effects. A study done by Shope et al. 1975 done by inoculation had a bacterial abscess at the site of inoculation, but did not differ between results in immunosuppressed mice and immunocompetent mice.

=== Other mammals ===
A study done on mice, shrews and two opossums showed no toxicity, no adverse effects or abnormalities, and the animals were sacrificed twelve days after last exposure. A study done on purebred beagles were found to have no toxicity after exposure for 90 days with doses of approximately 0.2, 1.6, and 17 mg/kg/day based on terminal body weights in each dose group. A study done on albino guinea pigs found no toxicity, mortality or irritation after dermal application of LdNPV. One study performed found a 'positive' reaction, but no conclusions were drawn as to the reason for the reaction.

Three studies on rabbits found no irritation, toxicity or mortality with dermal application. Three studies with application to the eye found no significant irritation. Two studies found evidence of irritation in ocular tests. A third study using LdMNPV powder in a 50 mg dose was found to be a moderate eye irritant; a test rabbit died during this study, but its death was found not to be of LdMNPV, the findings noted the presence of diarrhea. Irritation was reported in a study using 'LDP 53 air dried sample' lasting from 4 to 14 days; analysis found the presence of Staph epidermidis, Corynebacterium xerosis, Bacillus cereus, and Bacilius subtillis, but this was not labeled as significant.

=== Birds ===
In many tests across various species, birds have shown no toxicity or mortality to LdMNPV. Two oral studies, one on mallard ducks and the other on black-capped chickadees and house sparrows, had no adverse effects. Two field test studies found no significant difference on songbirds and caged quail populations at one to two months after application.

=== Insects ===
Studies performed on 46 species of non-target Lepidoptera species, adult Cyrtophleba coquilletti flies and Megachile rotundata bees found no infection, or significant mortality versus controls. Additional studies on honeybees found no detrimental effects. Studies on 17 genera and 31 species of ants were found not to be adversely affected by treatment with Gypchek.

=== Aquatic invertebrates ===
Tests on Daphnia, backswimmers, midges and water boatmen found no significant effects on survival. Another test found that the mortality rate for Daphnia fed gypsy moth larvae in virus treated water was similar to those in virus free water, 2.2% versus 3.1%.

== Identification of the gene ==
In 2011, the gene responsible for the behavior was identified. The baculovirus gene ecdysteroid UDP-glucosyltransferase (egt) inactivates the molting hormone 20-hydroxyecdysone (20-E). Specifically, EGT works by transferring a sugar moiety from a nucleotide sugar donor to a hydroxyl group on 20-E. By altering the virus, egt was seen as the gene responsible for manipulating the behavior of the larvae. It is the first example of an extended phenotype in a virus.

In another study, protein tyrosine phosphatase (PTP) was found to have a crucial role in the virus's infection of brain tissue, but was not responsible for the enhanced locomotory activity associated with climbing to the top of the trees to die. PTP augments the baculovirus infection of the brain. Researchers note that it is an example of a captured host gene that has evolved in a different way from its ancestral host.

== Zombie caterpillars in the media ==
'Zombie' caterpillars is a popular description of the behavior of L. d. subsp. dispar infected with LdMNPV. National Geographic described the gruesome effect of LdMNPV; "The virus forces the "zombie" caterpillars to climb trees, where the invader eventually liquifies its hosts' bodies into a dripping goo." Many news sources also reported the zombie-like nature of the infected caterpillar, stemming from the virus's ability to alter its behavior and liquify it in order to spread the infection. These same stories often referred to the discovery of EGT as the driving force behind the behavior of the infected larvae. The 'zombie' tag has also been used for caterpillars parasitized by a wasp.
