= Cyrtophloeba nigripalpis =

Scientific classification
- Kingdom: Animalia
- Phylum: Arthropoda
- Clade: Pancrustacea
- Class: Insecta
- Order: Diptera
- Family: Tachinidae
- Subfamily: Dexiinae
- Tribe: Voriini
- Genus: Cyrtophloeba
- Species: C. nigripalpis

Binomial name
- Cyrtophloeba nigripalpis (Aldrich, 1926)

Synonyms
- Opsophagus nigripalpis Aldrich, 1926

Species of fly

Cyrtophloeba nigripalpis is a species of fly in the family Tachinidae.

It is found in Chile.
