= Cyrtophloeba nitida =

Scientific classification
- Kingdom: Animalia
- Phylum: Arthropoda
- Clade: Pancrustacea
- Class: Insecta
- Order: Diptera
- Family: Tachinidae
- Subfamily: Dexiinae
- Tribe: Voriini
- Genus: Cyrtophloeba
- Species: C. nitida

Binomial name
- Cyrtophloeba nitida (Curran, 1930)

Synonyms
- Cyrtophleba nitida Curran, 1930

Species of fly

Cyrtophloeba nitida is a species of fly in the family Tachinidae.

== Distribution ==
Canada, United States.
