= Cyrtophloeba rhois =

Scientific classification
- Kingdom: Animalia
- Phylum: Arthropoda
- Class: Insecta
- Order: Diptera
- Family: Tachinidae
- Genus: Cyrtophloeba
- Species: C. rhois

Binomial name
- Cyrtophloeba rhois (Townsend, 1916)

Synonyms
- Eucyrtophloeba rhois Townsend, 1916

Species of fly

Cyrtophloeba rhois is a species of fly in the family Tachinidae.

== Distribution ==
Mexico.
