= Cyrtophloeba eremophila =

Scientific classification
- Kingdom: Animalia
- Phylum: Arthropoda
- Clade: Pancrustacea
- Class: Insecta
- Order: Diptera
- Family: Tachinidae
- Genus: Cyrtophloeba
- Species: C. eremophila

Binomial name
- Cyrtophloeba eremophila (Richter, 1967)

Synonyms
- Stackelbergula eremophila Richter, 1967

Species of fly

Cyrtophloeba eremophila is a species of fly in the family Tachinidae.

== Distribution ==
Uzbekistan, Mongolia, United Arab Emirates.
