= Cyrtophloeba ruricola =

Scientific classification
- Kingdom: Animalia
- Phylum: Arthropoda
- Clade: Pancrustacea
- Class: Insecta
- Order: Diptera
- Family: Tachinidae
- Subfamily: Dexiinae
- Tribe: Voriini
- Genus: Cyrtophloeba
- Species: C. ruricola

Binomial name
- Cyrtophloeba ruricola (Meigen, 1824)

Synonyms
- Cyrtophleba buccata Brauer & von Berganstamm, 1894; Cyrtophloeba nigripalpis Rondani, 1859; Plagia ericetorum Perris, 1852; Tachina ruricola Meigen, 1824

Species of fly

Cyrtophloeba ruricola is a species of fly in the family Tachinidae.

== Distribution ==
Eurasia
