= Cyrtophloeba horrida =

Scientific classification
- Kingdom: Animalia
- Phylum: Arthropoda
- Class: Insecta
- Order: Diptera
- Family: Tachinidae
- Subfamily: Dexiinae
- Tribe: Voriini
- Genus: Cyrtophloeba
- Species: C. horrida

Binomial name
- Cyrtophloeba horrida Giglio-Tos, 1893

Species of fly

Cyrtophloeba horrida is a species of bristle fly in the family Tachinidae. It is found in the United States, Trinidad and Tobago, and Mexico.
