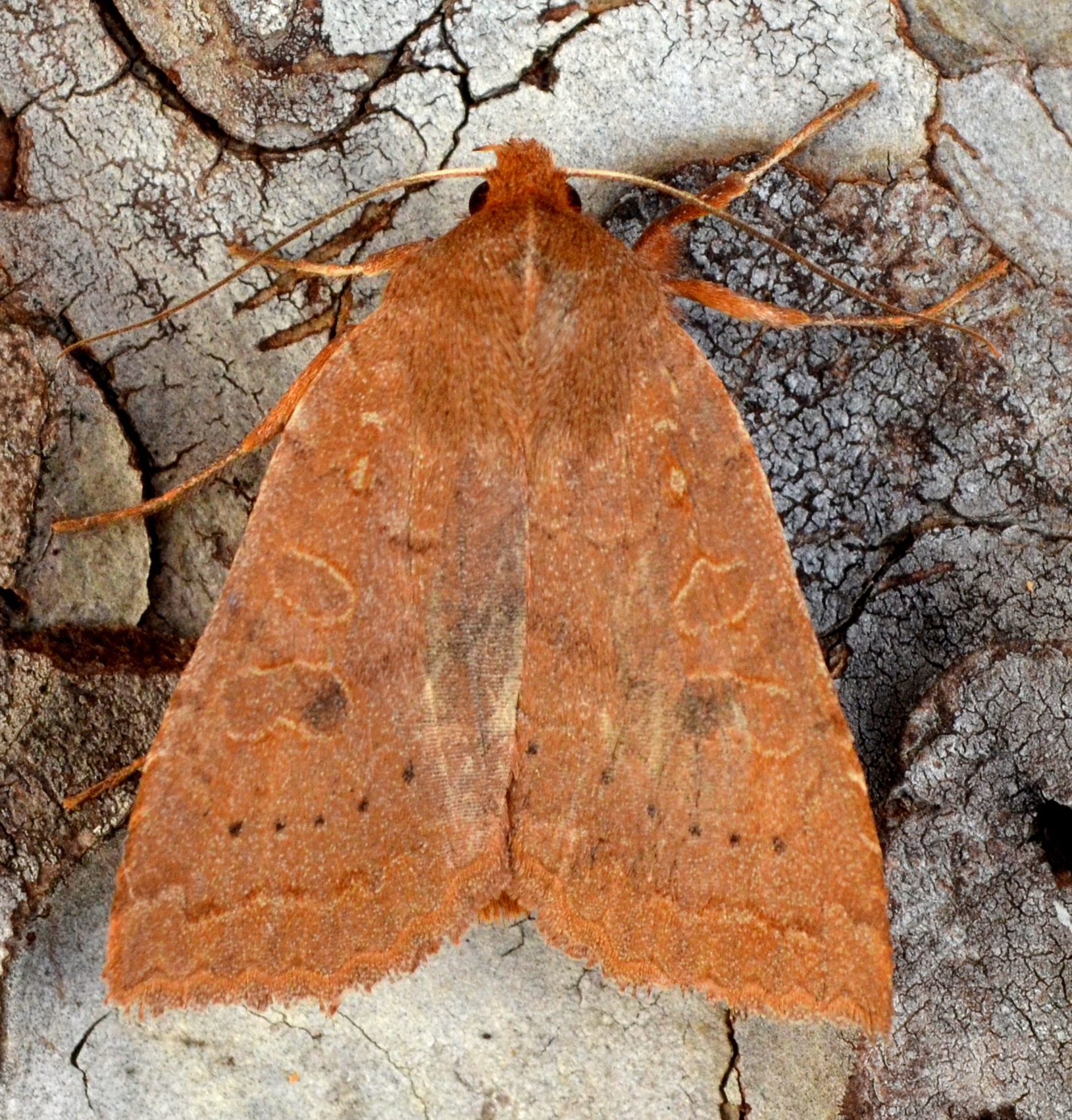
- Epiglaea decliva

Scientific classification
- Kingdom: Animalia
- Phylum: Arthropoda
- Class: Insecta
- Order: Lepidoptera
- Superfamily: Noctuoidea
- Family: Noctuidae
- Subtribe: Xylenina
- Genus: Epiglaea; Grote, 1878

Synonyms
- Harpaglaea Hampson, 1906

= Epiglaea =

Genus of moths

Epiglaea is a genus of moths of the family Noctuidae.

== Species ==
- Epiglaea apiata (Grote, 1874)
- Epiglaea decliva (Grote, 1874)
