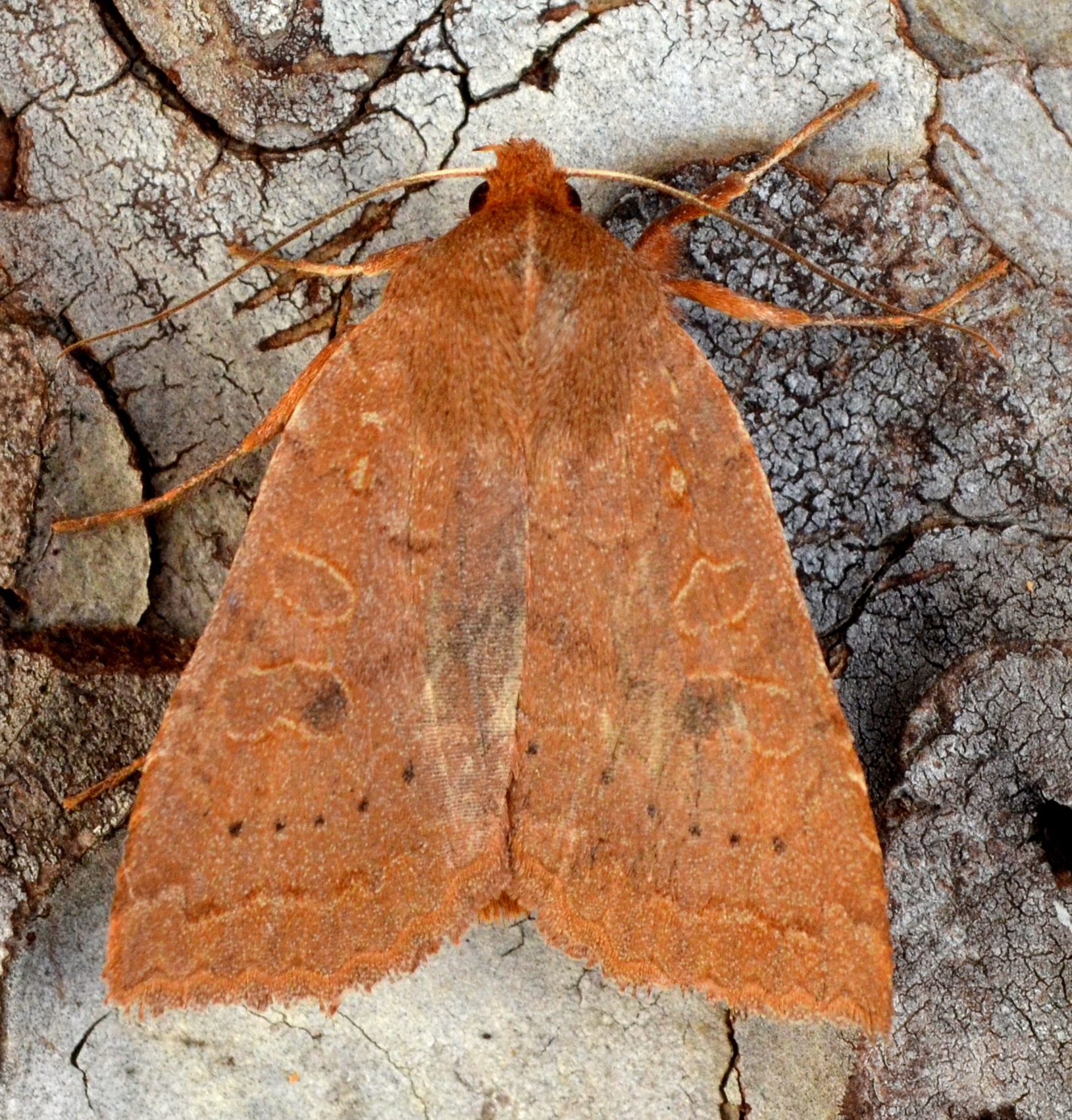

Scientific classification
- Domain: Eukaryota
- Kingdom: Animalia
- Phylum: Arthropoda
- Class: Insecta
- Order: Lepidoptera
- Superfamily: Noctuoidea
- Family: Noctuidae
- Genus: Epiglaea
- Species: E. decliva

Binomial name
- Epiglaea decliva (Grote, 1874)

Synonyms
- Orthosia decliva Grote, 1874; Glaea deleta Grote, 1877

= Epiglaea decliva =

Species of moth

Epiglaea decliva, the sloping sallow moth, is a moth of the family Noctuidae. It is found in North America, where it has been recorded from Quebec and Maine to South Carolina, west to Kansas and north to Alberta. The habitat consists of barrens, thickets, woodlots and forests.

The wingspan is 40–50 mm. The larvae can be found from May to July. The species overwinters as an egg.
