= Cyrtophloeba arabica =

Scientific classification
- Kingdom: Animalia
- Phylum: Arthropoda
- Class: Insecta
- Order: Diptera
- Family: Tachinidae
- Genus: Cyrtophloeba
- Species: C. arabica

Binomial name
- Cyrtophloeba arabica Zeegers, 2007

Species of fly

Cyrtophloeba arabica is a species of fly in the family Tachinidae.

== Distribution ==
Yemen.
