= Epiglaea apiata =

Scientific classification
- Kingdom: Animalia
- Phylum: Arthropoda
- Class: Insecta
- Order: Lepidoptera
- Superfamily: Noctuoidea
- Family: Noctuidae
- Genus: Epiglaea
- Species: E. apiata

Binomial name
- Epiglaea apiata (Grote, 1874)

Synonyms
- Orthosia apiata Grote, 1874; Glaea pastillicans Morrison, 1875

Species of moth

Epiglaea apiata, the pointed sallow moth or cranberry blossom worm, is a moth of the family Noctuidae. It is found in North America, where it has been recorded from Florida, Georgia, Indiana, Louisiana, Maine, Maryland, Michigan, Minnesota, New Brunswick, North Carolina, Ohio, Quebec, South Carolina and Wisconsin.

The wingspan is about 34 mm. Adults have been recorded on wing from August to March, with most records in September and October.

The larvae feed on Oxycoccus and Cyanococcus species.
