= Disparlure =

Names
- IUPAC name cis-7,8-epoxy-2-methyloctadecane
- Other names (2S-cis)-2-Decyl-3-(5-methylhexyl)oxirane

Identifiers
| CAS Number | 54910-51-9 |
| 3D model (JSmol) | Interactive image |
| ChemSpider | 149826 |
| ECHA InfoCard | 100.053.973 |
| EC Number | 259-390-8 |
| PubChem CID | 171384 |
| UNII | A5ZD42XF7G |
| CompTox Dashboard (EPA) | DTXSID8075041 |
- InChI: InChI=1S/C19H38O/c1-4-5-6-7-8-9-10-11-15-18-19(20-18)16-13-12-14-17(2)3/h17-19H,4-16H2,1-3H3/t18-,19+/m0/s1 Key: HFOFYNMWYRXIBP-RBUKOAKNSA-N
- SMILES: CCCCCCCCCC[C@H]1[C@H](O1)CCCCC(C)C

Properties
| Chemical formula | C_{19}H_{38}O |
| Molar mass | 282.512 g·mol^{−1} |
| Appearance | Viscous colorless oil |
| Density | 0.828 g cm^{−3} at 25 °C |
| Boiling point | 146–148 °C (295–298 °F; 419–421 K) |

Hazards
| NFPA 704 (fire diamond) | 0 2 0 |
| Flash point | 52 °C (126 °F; 325 K) |
| Safety data sheet (SDS) | External MSDS |
- Except where otherwise noted, data are given for materials in their standard state (at 25 °C [77 °F], 100 kPa). Infobox references

Disparlure (chemical name cis-7,8-epoxy-2-methyloctadecane) is a chemical compound with the formula C_{19}H_{38}O. It is a sex pheromone found in moths, such as the spongy moth (Lymantria dispar), and is used to attract a mate.

== Occurrences ==
Disparlure is produced by female moths, such as the spongy and nun moths. It is a sex pheromone, a chemical that is released by the moths in order to attract a male mate. Disparlure has two enantiomers, referred to by (+) and (−). The (+)-enantiomer is typically used to attract the males by the females, while the (−)-enantiomer tends to have the opposite effect. The (−)-enantiomer inhibits attractions and turns the males away from females.

== Uses ==
Disparlure, which is the synthetic form of the spongy moth sex pheromone, is used to detect its newly founded populations and estimate population density across the United States. The spongy moth is a very harmful pest for plants and affects forest, shade, and orchard trees across North America and parts of Europe. Using disparlure as a pest management tool has been shown to be effective to reduce damage to forests. This pheromone can usually be applied to trap, catch and disrupt spongy moth mating in order to address the economic and environmental impacts caused by the expanding range of infestation. Successful mating attempts can be significantly reduced as a result.

== Synthesis ==
There are two main ways to synthesize disparlure. They are either using chiral pools, which are costly and time consuming, or asymmetric epoxidation, which is quick, easy, and cheap. Some studies have used asymmetric epoxidation, which involves processes such as constructing an epoxide ring from the diols, filtrations, and chromatography. This procedure can produce yields over 70% using a six-step process that is simple and inexpensive. This strategy, as well as others, can be used to investigate other insect sex pheromones because these methods are so flexible and reliable. The synthesis of disparlure found that the natural form (+) is more active than its (-)-enantiomer and there have been over twenty different approaches to synthesize the natural form of disparlure. One such method involved four steps beginning with the formation of a cis-vinyl epoxide by reacting undecanyl aldehydes with (Z)-(γ-chloroallyl)diisopinocampheylborane. Hydroboration and oxidation of this cis-vinyl epoxide yields a cis-3,4-epoxy alcohol that can then be purified using recrystallization. The final step is tosylation and alkylation of the alcohol which gives (+)-cis-7,8-epoxy-2-methyloctadecane with high yield. Additionally, the stereospecific Gringard products of (R)-2,3-cyclohexylideneglyceraldehyde are two 1,2-syn-diols that can be used to produce either enantiomer of disparlure. Additionally, a simple reaction of disparlure with an aqueous solution of weak acid and potassium permanganate produces undecanoic acid and 6-methyl-heptanoic acid, two carboxylic acids.

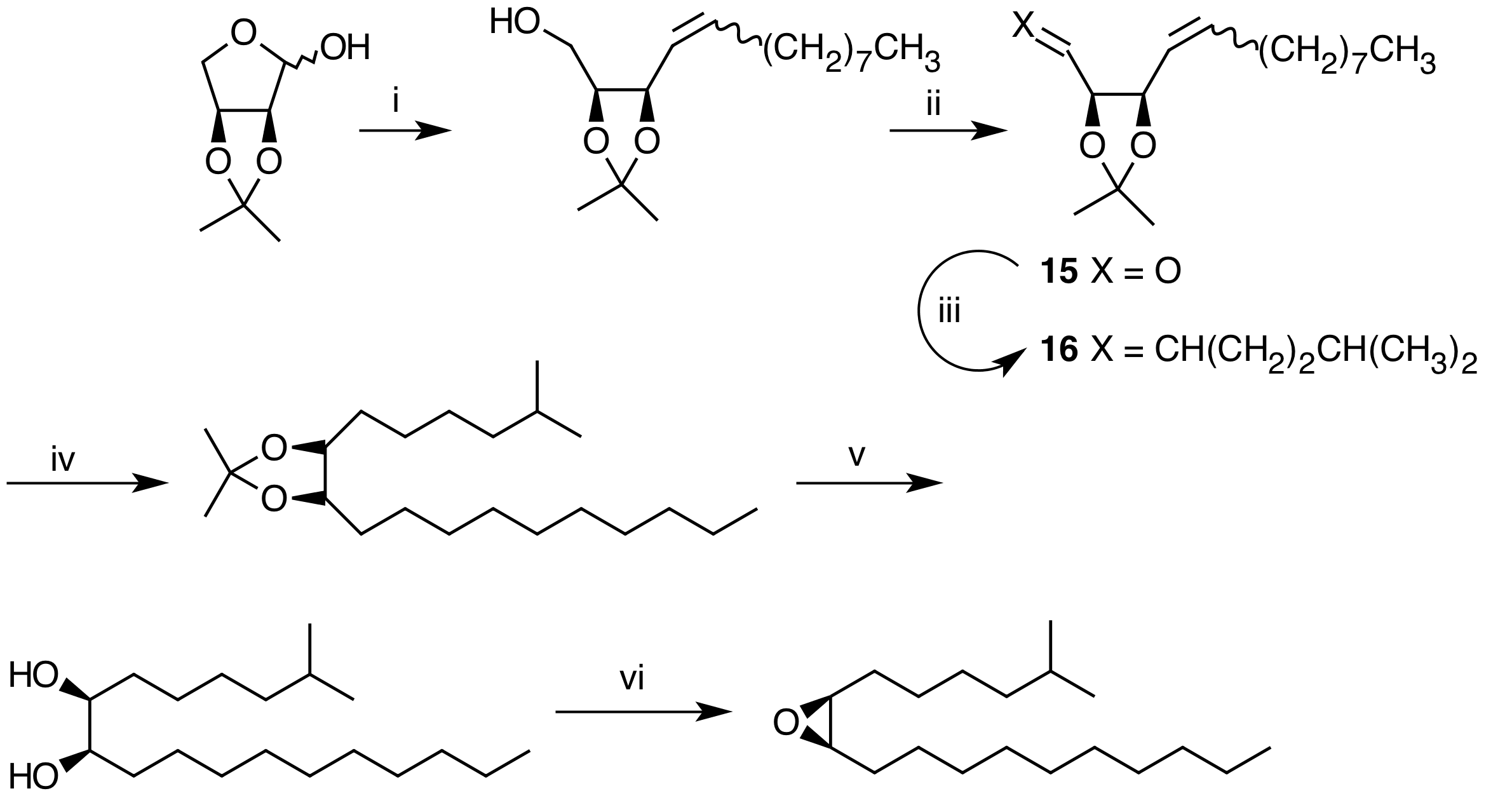
Another route to synthesize disparlure

Reagents and conditions:

- (i) Ph_{3}P^{+}(CH_{2})_{8}CH_{3}Br^{−}, n-BuLi, THF, 0 °C to room temperature, 97%
- (ii) (COCl)_{2}, DMSO, CH_{2}Cl_{2} then Et_{3}N, −55 °C to room temperature;
- (iii) Ph_{3}P+(CH_{2})_{3}CH(CH_{3})_{2}Br^{−}, n-BuLi, THF, 0 °C to room temperature, 90% overall from 14;
- (iv) H_{2}, Ra-Ni, MeOH, room temperature, 96%;
- (v) 37% HCl, THF/H_{2}O (2:1), room temperature, 99%;
- (vi) (a) CH_{3}C(OEt)_{3}, PPTS, toluene, 110 °C; (b) TMSCl, CH_{2}Cl_{2}, room temperature; (c) 1 N KOH in MeOH, THF, 0 °C to room temperature, 88%.
