= Cyrtophloeba =

- Cyrtophleba vernalis

Scientific classification
- Kingdom: Animalia
- Phylum: Arthropoda
- Clade: Pancrustacea
- Class: Insecta
- Order: Diptera
- Family: Tachinidae
- Subfamily: Dexiinae
- Tribe: Voriini
- Genus: Cyrtophloeba; Rondani, 1856

Synonyms
- Cyrtophleba Rondani, 1856; Cyrthophleba Rondani, 1857 (Missp.); Cyrthoplaeba Rondani, 1857 (Missp.); Cyrthophlaeba Rondani, 1859 (Missp.); Eucyrtophloeba Townsend, 1916; Opsophagus Aldrich, 1926; Crytophoeba Vimmer & Soukup 1940 (Missp.); Cyrtophoeba Vimmer & Soukup, 1940 (Missp.); Cyrtoploeba Vimmer & Soukup 1940 (Missp.); Stackelbergula Richter, 1967

Genus of flies

Cyrtophloeba is a genus of flies in the family Tachinidae.

== Species ==
- Cyrtophloeba arabica Zeegers, 2007
- Cyrtophloeba asiatica Mesnil, 1974
- Cyrtophloeba coquilletti Aldrich, 1926
- Cyrtophloeba eremophila (Richter, 1967)
- Cyrtophloeba horrida Giglio-Tos, 1893
- Cyrtophloeba nigripalpis (Aldrich, 1926)
- Cyrtophloeba nitida Curran, 1930
- Cyrtophloeba pollyclari Rocha-e-Silva, de M. D'A. Lopes & Della Lucia, 1999
- Cyrtophloeba rhois Townsend, 1916
- Cyrtophloeba ruricola (Meigen, 1824)
- Cyrtophloeba vernalis (Kramer, 1917)
