= Spongy moth in New Zealand =

Lymantria dispar dispar in New Zealand

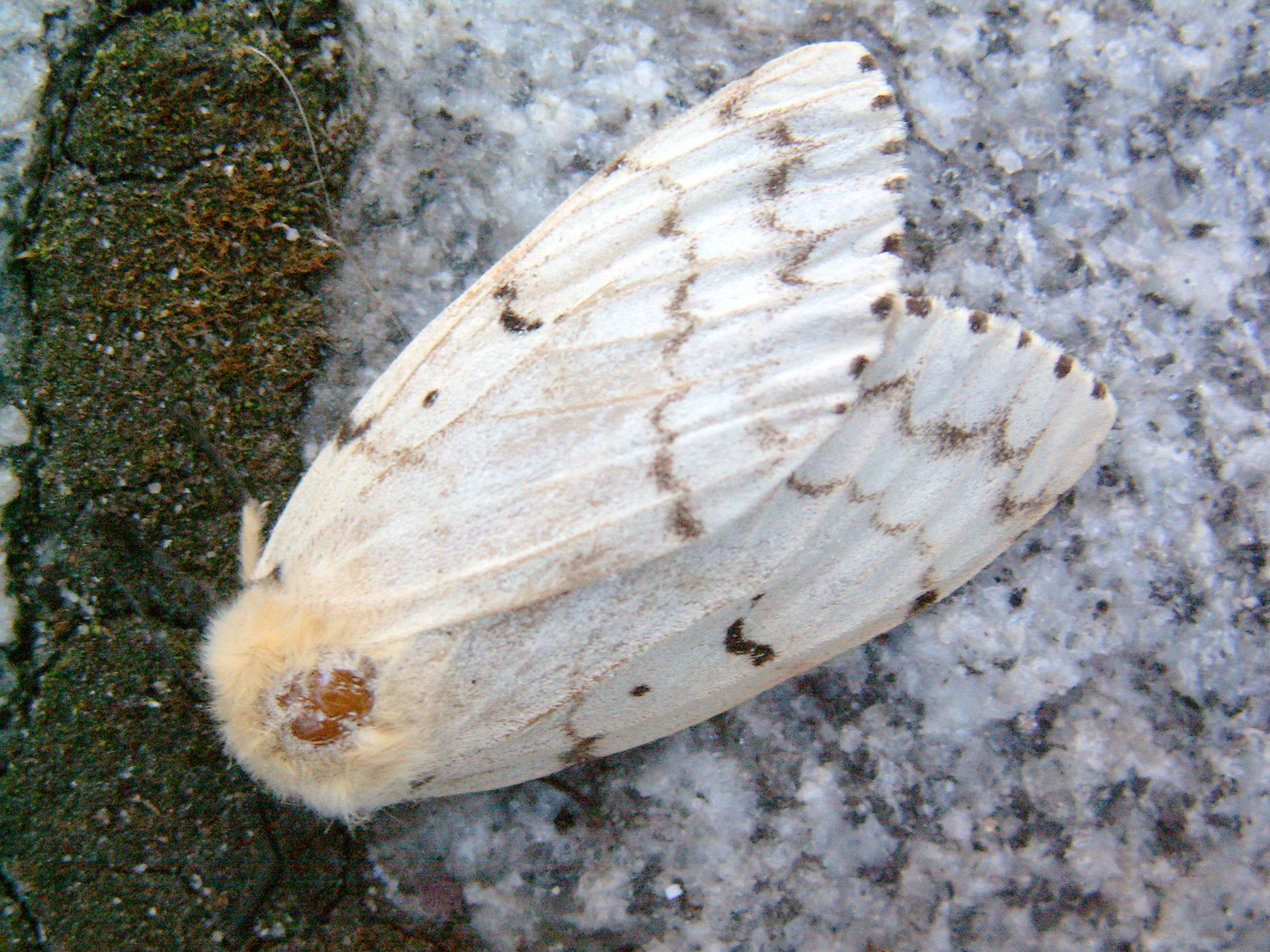
An adult white female gypsy moth (Lymantria dispar dispar).

The gypsy moth (Lymantria dispar dispar), also termed the spongy moth in the United States, an invasive species from Eurasia, has been discovered in New Zealand. The gypsy moth has potentially disastrous effects on New Zealand agriculture; an intensive eradication programme was planned and undertaken, and the moth did not become established.

Gypsy moth eggs are frequently found during border biosecurity checks, commonly on used vehicles, and were first discovered in the 1990s.

== 2003 Hamilton gypsy moth spray ==
In 2003 a live adult moth in viable condition was found in an early warning pheromone trap in the North Island city of Hamilton. Since Hamilton is an entry point for a large amount of international air freight it was presumed that the moth had entered New Zealand in an aircraft. An aerial pesticide spraying programme by the Ministry of Agriculture and Forestry using the Foray 48B insecticide was carried out over the city from October 2003. Health concerns were raised, but a report to the Ministry of Health concluded that there were no grounds for these. In 2004, officials in the Ministry of Agriculture and Forestry declined Hamilton's Fraser High School's compensation claim for the cost of relief teachers to cover staff absences during the operation.

== See also ==
- Invasive species in New Zealand
- Lymantria dispar in the United States
