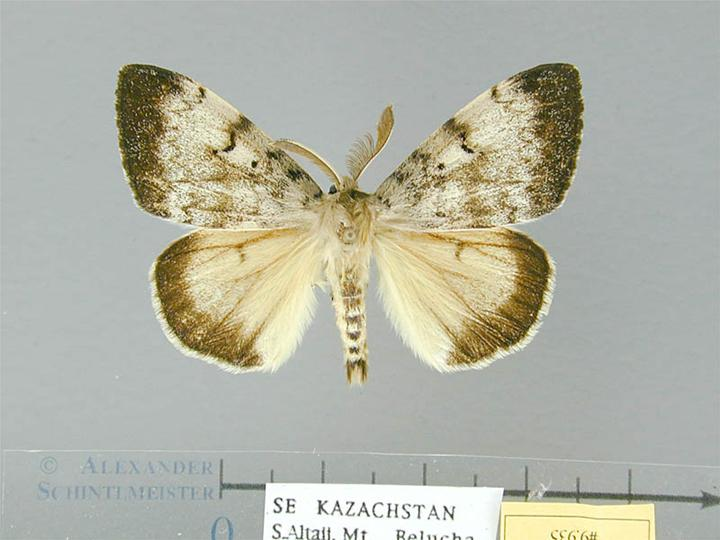
- Mounted male
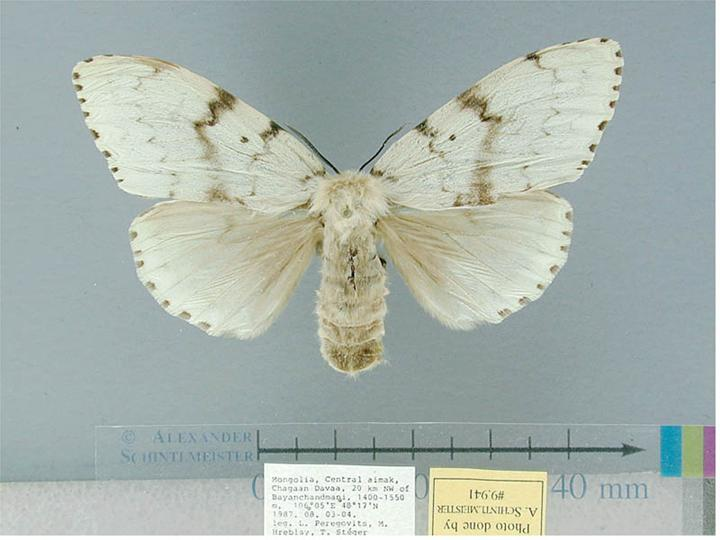
- Mounted female

Scientific classification
- Domain: Eukaryota
- Kingdom: Animalia
- Phylum: Arthropoda
- Class: Insecta
- Order: Lepidoptera
- Superfamily: Noctuoidea
- Family: Erebidae
- Genus: Lymantria
- Species: L. dispar
- Subspecies: L. d. asiatica

Trinomial name
- Lymantria dispar asiatica Vnukovskij, 1926

= Lymantria dispar asiatica =

Subspecies of moth

Lymantria dispar asiatica, the LDA moth or Asian spongy moth, also known as the Asian gypsy moth, (Note: In July, 2021, the Entomological Society of America removed "gypsy moth" from its Common Names of Insects and Related Organisms List, and is seeking community input on a new common name.) is a moth in the family Erebidae of Eurasian origin. It is similar to Lymantria dispar dispar in appearance, but adult females can fly. It is classified as a pest and is host to over 500 species of trees, shrubs and plants.

== Common names ==
Lymantria dispar asiatica has several common names including the Asian gypsy moth, persimmon caterpillar or persimmon tussock moth. USDA’s Animal and Plant Health Inspection Service (APHIS) replaced the common name for regulated Lymantria moths. APHIS changed “Asian gypsy moth” (Lymantria dispar asiatica, L. dispar japonica, L. albescens, L. postalba, and L. umbrosa) with “flighted spongy moth complex.”

=== Taxonomy ===
Lymantria dispar asiatica was originally described as a subspecies of Lymantria dispar by Vnukovskij in 1926. It was synonymized with Lymantria dispar dispar by Schintlmeister in 2004. L. d. asiatica is treated as a subspecies of L. dispar.

The species has undergone the same reclassification of the family as Lymantria dispar, moving from Lymantriidae to Noctuidae to Erebidae.

== Range ==
=== Asia ===
Found throughout temperate Asia. Usually east of the Ural Mountains up into the far east of Russia and most of China and Korea. It is not found south of the Himalayan range in India.

=== North America ===
Lymantria dispar asiatica was found in North America in late 1991. It was first found in British Columbia, Canada. It also was found in the Pacific Northwest Washington and Oregon, United States. Transportation was suspected to have been from ships from Russia that had become infested with egg masses, with the eggs having been hatched and the larvae then blown ashore. This infestation was eradicated. It reappeared in Washington in 1997 and was found in Oregon in 2000. It was reported that these infestations were eradicated in 2005.

It was also found in North Carolina in 1997, the transportation having been from shipping cargo containers from Germany. This infestation was eradicated. As of 2021 the Washington State Department of Agriculture is again trying to eradicate both asiatica and L. d. dispar - using Bacillus thuringiensis kurstaki (Btk) toxin - to prevent their establishment in the state.

== Life cycle ==
Lymantria dispar asiatica has four stages of life: egg, larvae, pupae and moth.

=== Adult moths ===
The adult female moth is dirty- to creamy-white, with dark bands across the forewings. The hindwings are white. The female's body is stout and densely covered with hairs, and the antennae are dark brown and thread-like.

The adult male moth is smaller than the female moth, and the wings are dark brown with black bands across the forewings. The hindwings are brown and may possess a crescent-shaped discal spot. Its head's front vertex and scape are light brown. The antennae are light brown and feathery.

Adult moths are incapable of eating: the adult only mates and lays eggs. Adult moths will die within one to three weeks after emerging.

=== Eggs ===
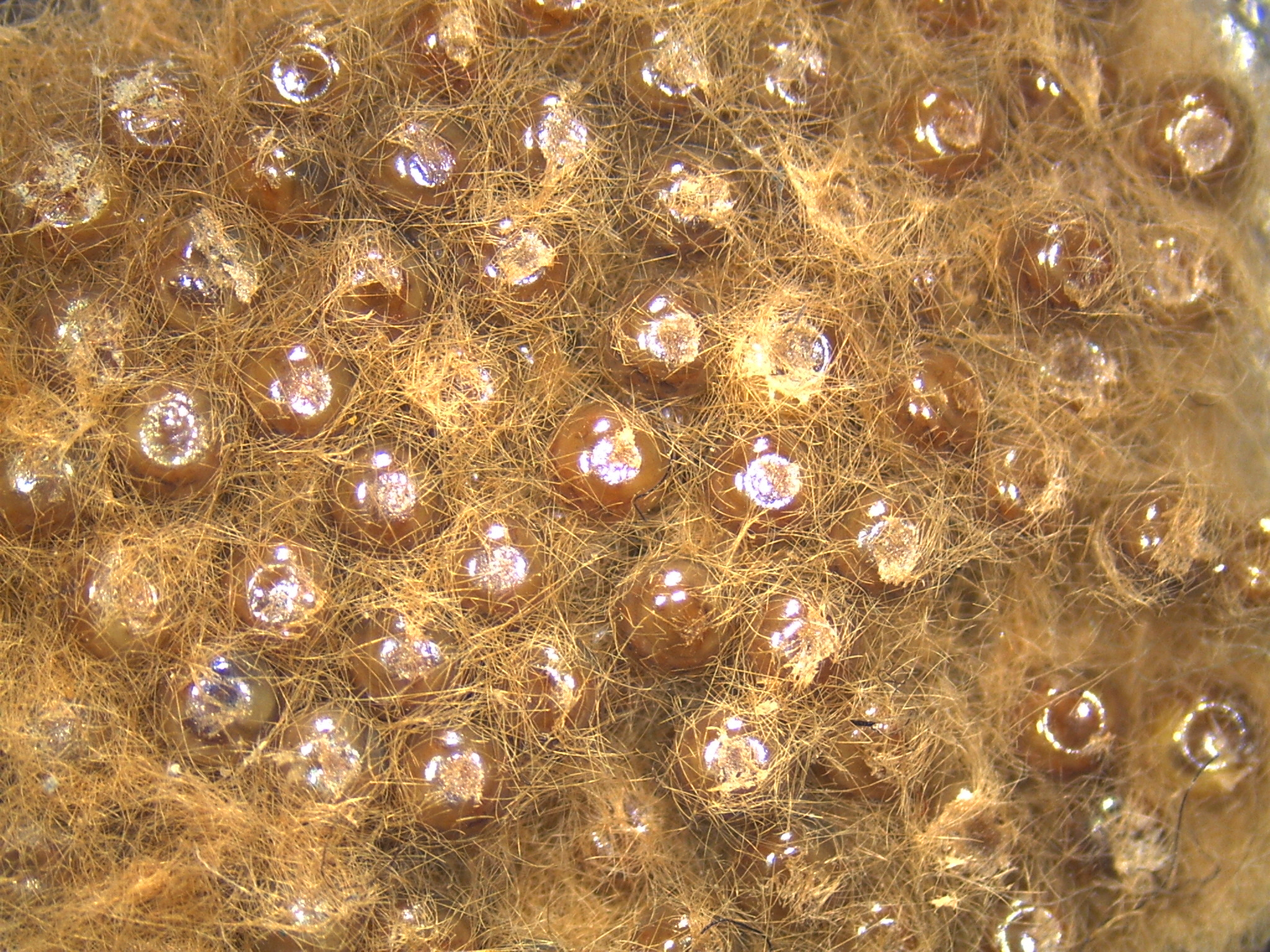
A close-up view of an egg mass

Eggs are laid in clusters that are about the size of a dime. The eggs are dormant during the winter. Larvae will hatch from the eggs in the spring.

==== Egg placement ====
In China and Korea, egg masses are placed high up on the under-surfaces of branches of large pine trees. In Russia and Mongolia, eggs are laid on rock outcrops or on the soil under boulders. Egg masses are laid on top of other egg masses or the remains of previous years' egg masses. In far eastern Russia, egg masses are laid on undersides of leaves of deciduous trees. When the leaves fall, the eggs are covered with snow and become insulated from temperatures which would otherwise kill them.

=== Larvae ===
Full grown larvae are 50–55 mm long and a ground-color gray, laterally irrorated with an irregular pattern of white. Larvae can also be yellow or black.

When larvae hatch, they disperse by ballooning away. Larvae spin silk threads and hang from them, waiting for the wind to blow them to a suitable host. In central Asia, hatching larvae balloon off the ridges. In Mongolia, dispersal is done by ballooning from rock faces or pine trees. Distances vary from a hundred meters up to a kilometer or more, assuming the conditions are right. In China and Korea and larvae disperse to suitable tree species to feed, but adults fly back to the large pines for oviposition, a cycle which is repeated yearly.

=== Pupae ===
Larvae will enter the pupae stage in June or July. Adult moths will emerge from the pupae in ten to fourteen days.

== Efforts to prevent spread ==
=== Shipping ===
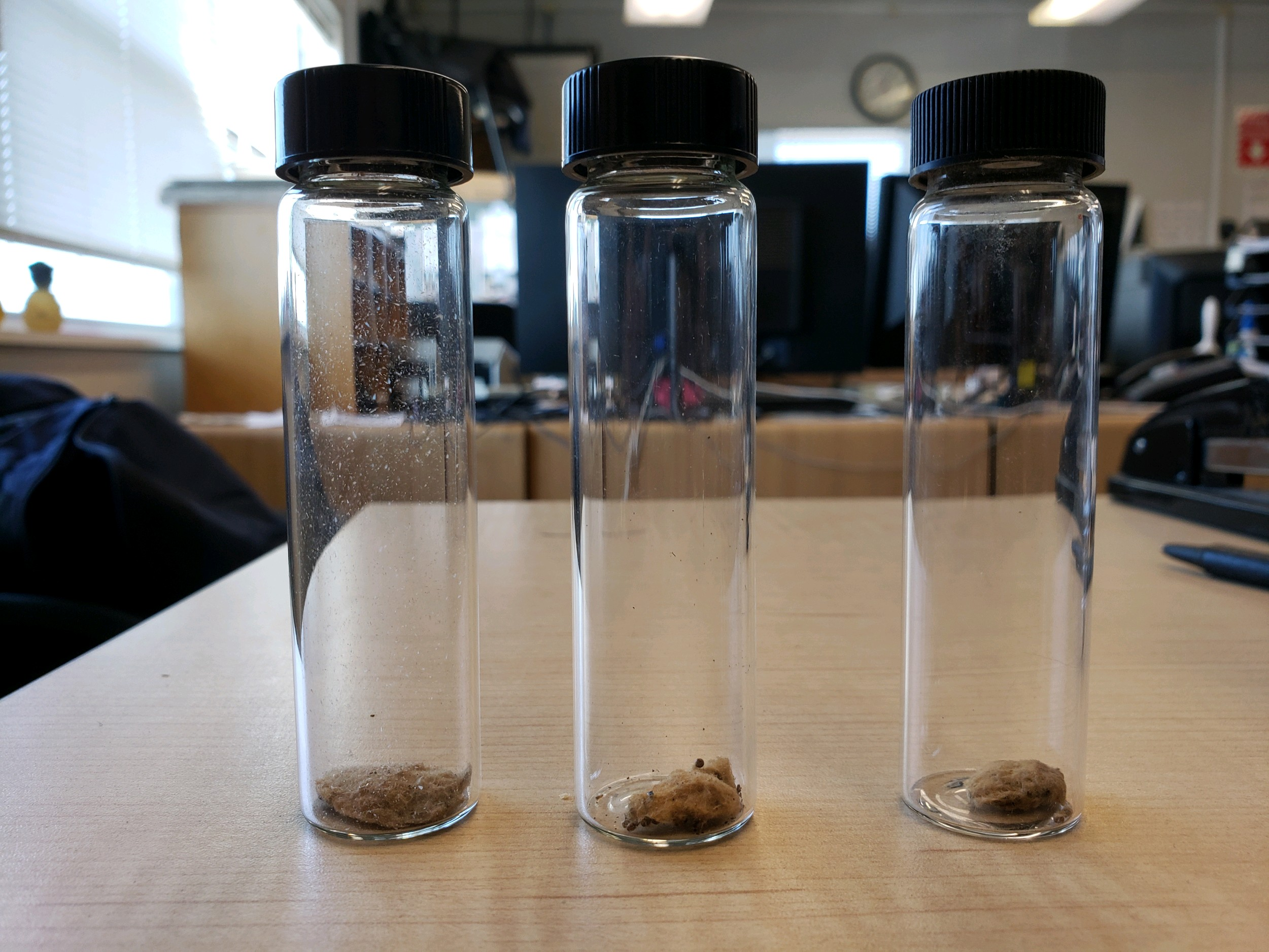
Egg masses found on merchant vessels in 2019

Regulations vary, but it is recommended to obtain inspections for all vessels which are active in far eastern Russia, Japan, Korea, and northern China. All shipping vessels could have egg masses, inside or outside the ship. As of August 2012, ships in the Pacific have had interceptions, while the Atlantic has had none.
