= Undecanal =

Names
- Preferred IUPAC name Undecanal
- Other names Undecyl aldehyde

Identifiers
CAS Number	112-44-7
3D model (JSmol)	Interactive image
ChEBI	CHEBI:46202
ChemSpider	7894
DrugBank	DB04093
ECHA InfoCard	100.003.611
EC Number	203-972-6
PubChem CID	8186
UNII	B6P0A9PSHN
CompTox Dashboard (EPA)	DTXSID4021688
- InChI: InChI=1S/C11H22O/c1-2-3-4-5-6-7-8-9-10-11-12/h11H,2-10H2,1H3 Key: KMPQYAYAQWNLME-UHFFFAOYSA-N; InChI=1/C11H22O/c1-2-3-4-5-6-7-8-9-10-11-12/h11H,2-10H2,1H3 Key: KMPQYAYAQWNLME-UHFFFAOYAE
- SMILES: O=CCCCCCCCCCC

Properties
Chemical formula	C_{11}H_{22}O
Molar mass	170.296 g·mol^{−1}
Appearance	colourless oil
Density	0.825 g cm^{−3}
Melting point	−2 °C (28 °F; 271 K)
Boiling point	225 °C (437 °F; 498 K)

Hazards
- GHS labelling
Pictograms	(GHS07: Exclamation mark)
Signal word	Warning
Hazard statements	H315, H412
Precautionary statements	P264, P273, P280, P302+P352, P321, P332+P313, P362, P501
- Except where otherwise noted, data are given for materials in their standard state (at 25 °C [77 °F], 100 kPa). Infobox references

Undecanal, also known as undecyl aldehyde, is an organic compound with the chemical formula C_{10}H_{21}CHO or CH_{3}(CH_{2})_{9}CHO. It is an eleven-carbon aldehyde. A colourless, oily liquid, undecanal is a component of perfumes. Although it occurs naturally in citrus oils, it is produced commercially by hydroformylation of decene.

It has been registered under the EU REACH scheme at >1000 tonnes by Oxea, which confirms the status as irritant.

Undecanal is used in the synthesis of Disparlure.
