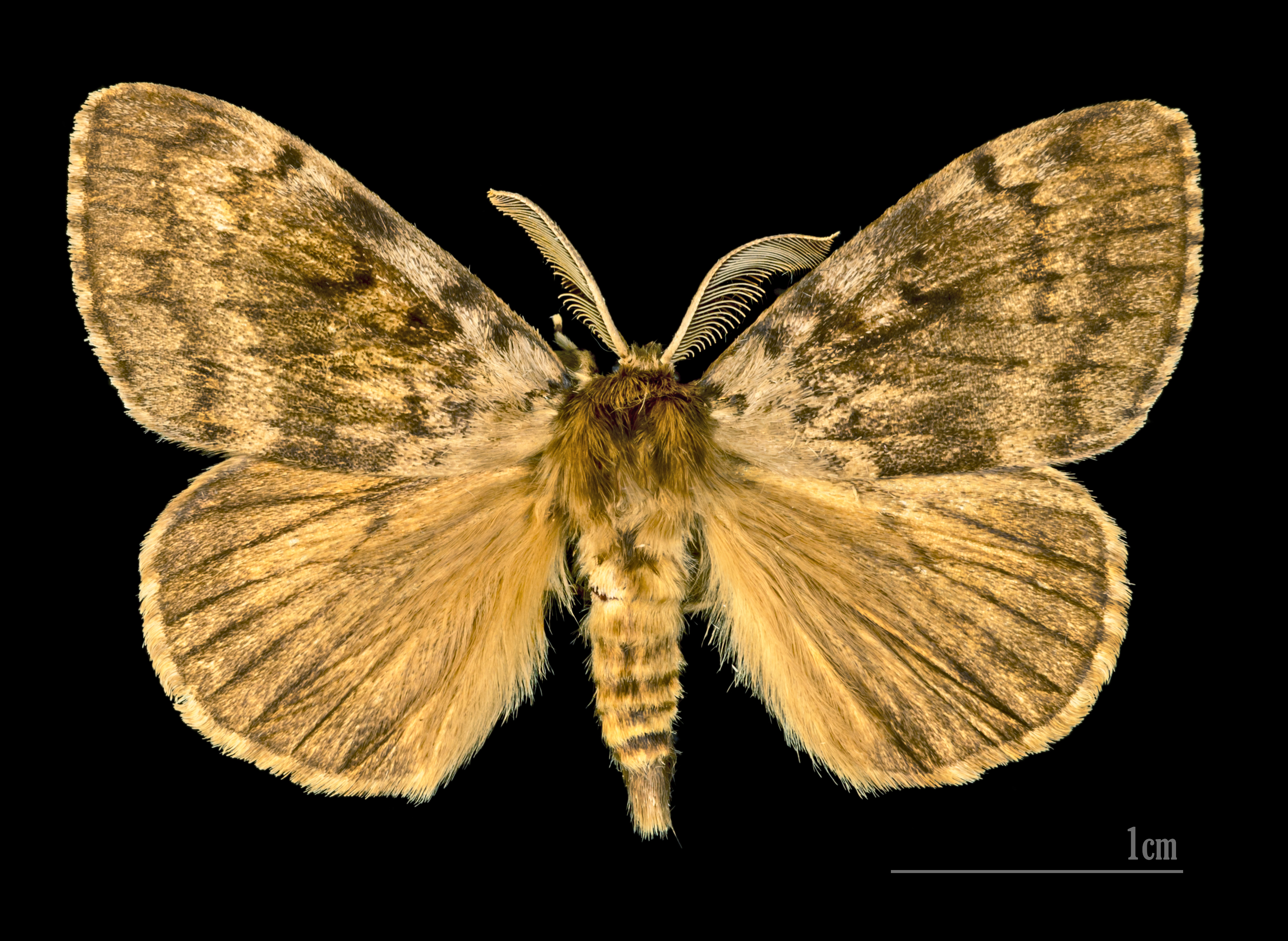
- Mounted Lymantria dispar dispar male
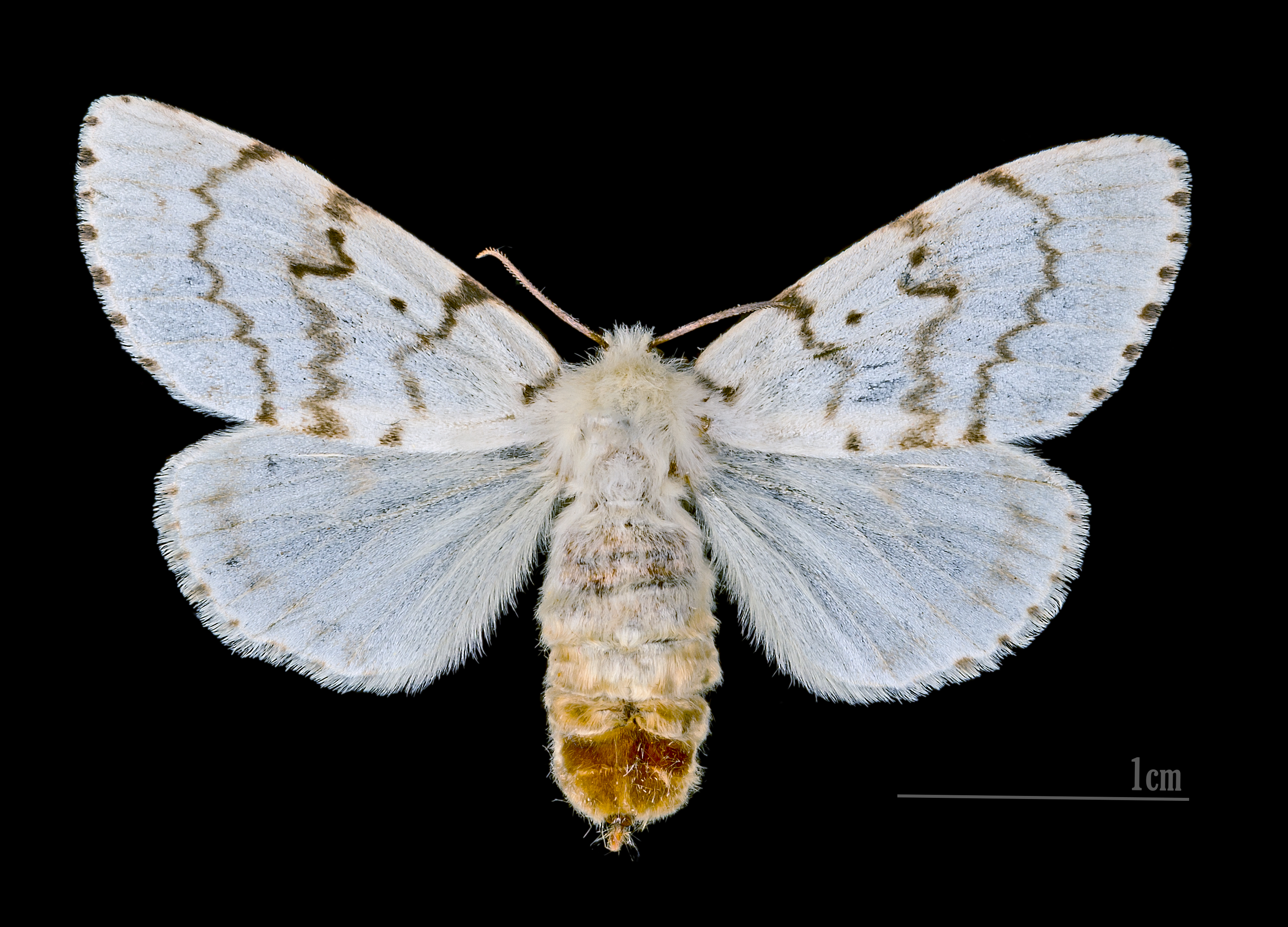
- Mounted Lymantria dispar female

Conservation status
- Secure (NatureServe)

Scientific classification
- Kingdom: Animalia
- Phylum: Arthropoda
- Clade: Pancrustacea
- Class: Insecta
- Order: Lepidoptera
- Superfamily: Noctuoidea
- Family: Erebidae
- Genus: Lymantria
- Species: L. dispar

Binomial name
- Lymantria dispar (Linnaeus, 1758)

Subspecies
- L. d. dispar; L. d. asiatica; L. d. japonica

Synonyms
- Phalaena dispar Linnaeus, 1758; Ocneria dispar (Linnaeus, 1758); Porthetria dispar (Linnaeus, 1758)

= Lymantria dispar =

Species of moth

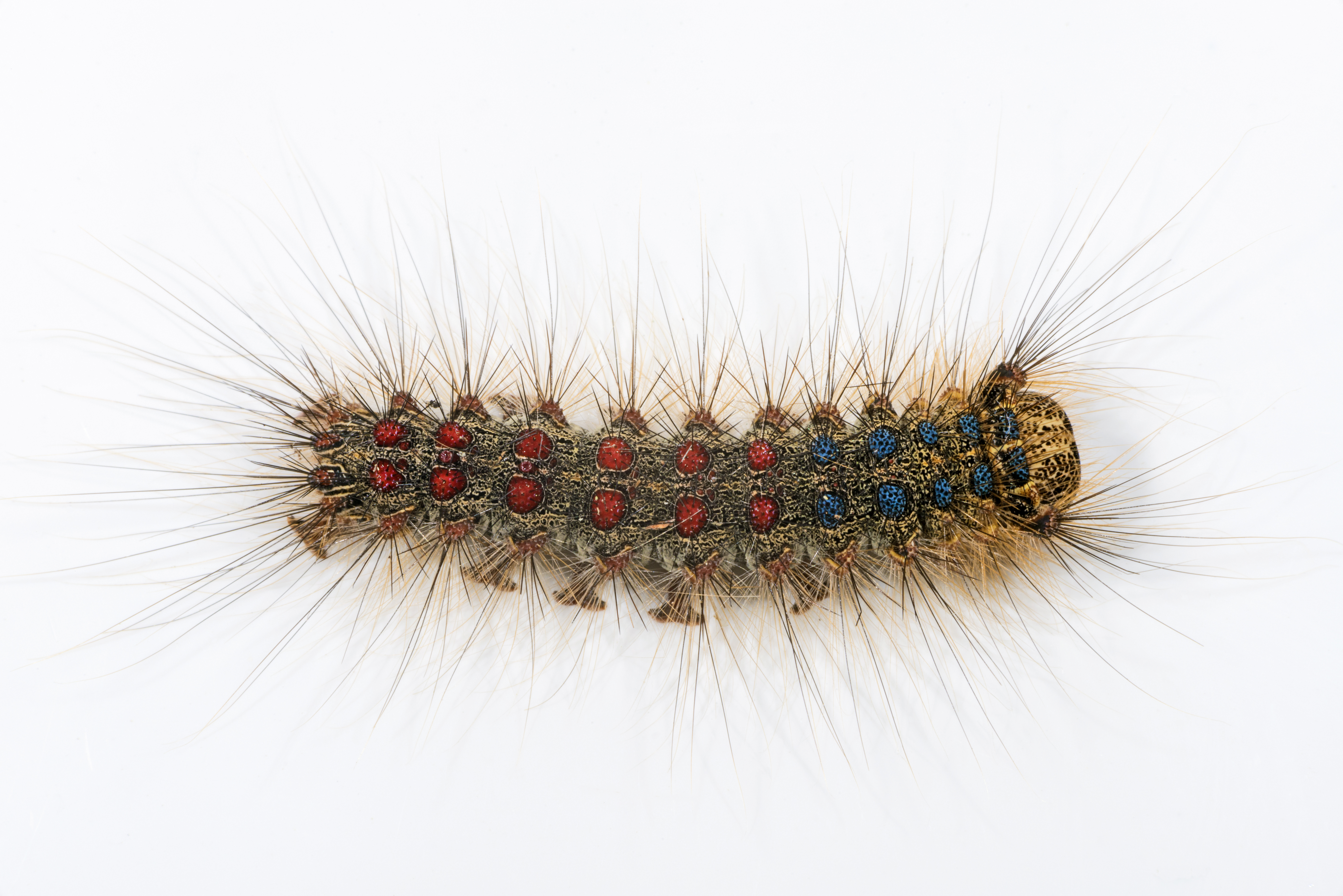
A L. dispar caterpillar

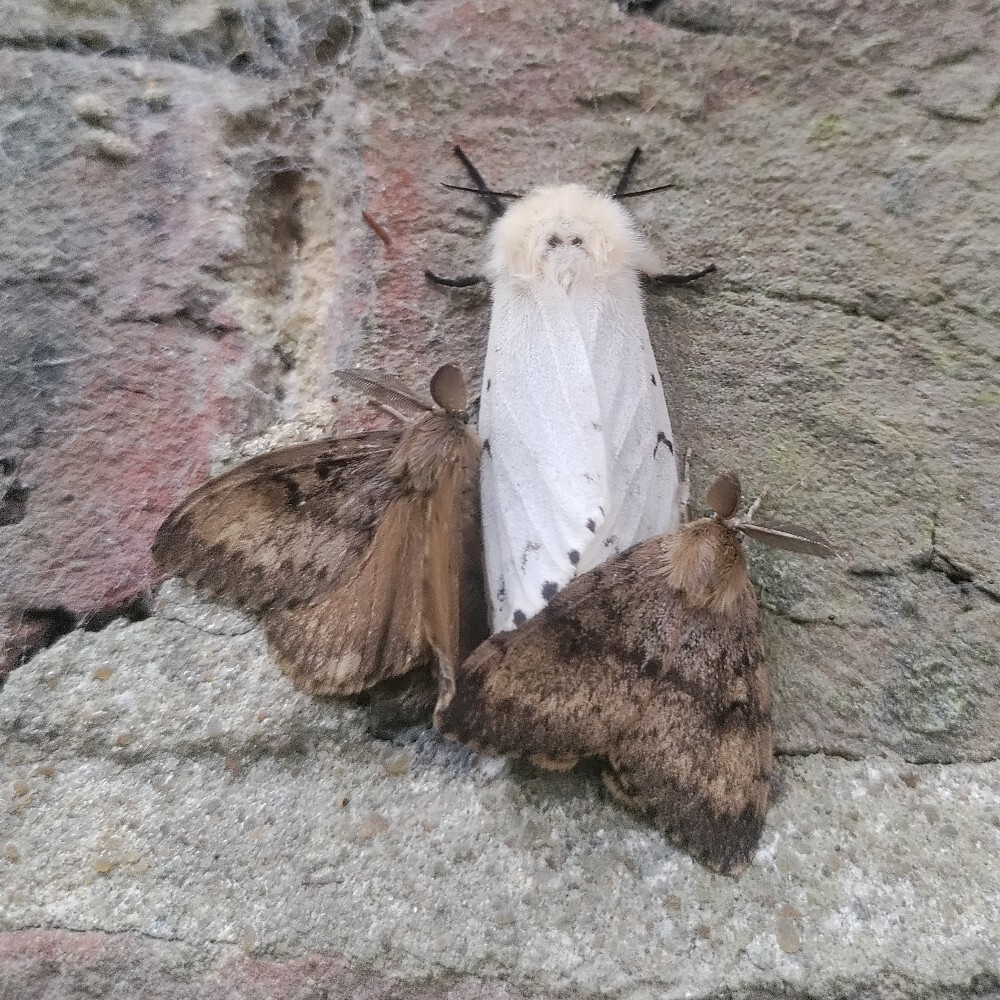
Male & Female Moths

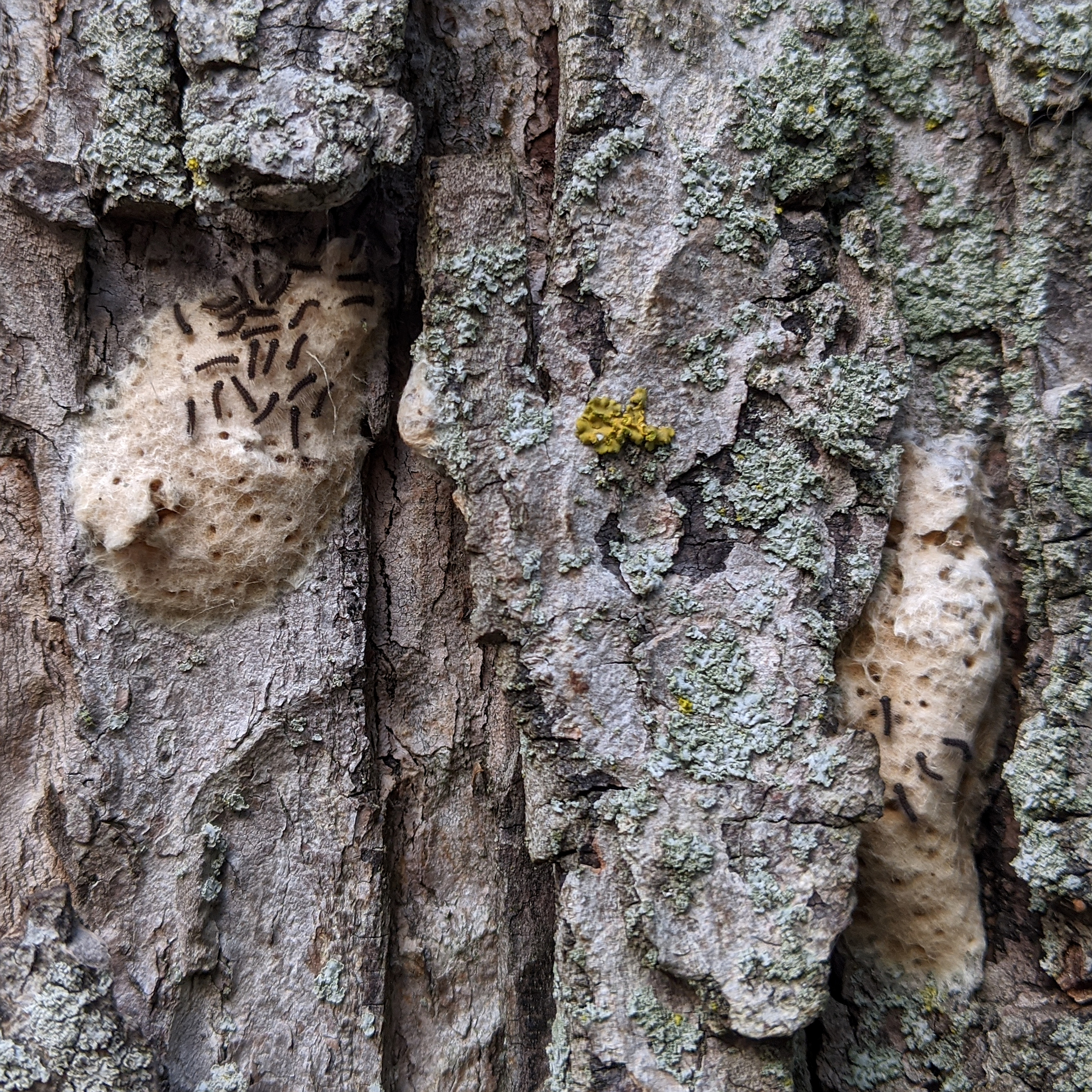
L. dispar larvae emerging from egg masses.

Lymantria dispar, also known as the gypsy moth, and in the United States, the spongy moth, is a species of moth in the family Erebidae native to Europe and Asia. Lymantria dispar is subdivided into several subspecies, with subspecies such as L. d. dispar and L. d. japonica being clearly identifiable without ambiguity. Lymantria dispar has been introduced to several continents and is now additionally found as an invasive species in Africa, North America and South America. The polyphagous larvae live on a variety of deciduous and coniferous trees and can cause severe damage in years of mass reproduction. Due to these features, Lymantria dispar is listed among the world's 100 worst invasive alien species.

== Etymology ==
The etymology of "gypsy moth" is not conclusively known; however, the term is known to have been in use (as 'Gipsey') as early as 1832.

Moths of the subfamily Lymantriinae are commonly called tussock moths due to the tussock-like tufts of hair on the caterpillars.

The name Lymantria dispar is composed of two Latin-derived words. The generic name Lymantria means 'destroyer'. The species epithet dispar means 'to separate' in Latin; it refers to the sexual dimorphism observed in the male and female imagines.

In June 2021 the 17-member governing board of the Entomological Society of America decided to remove the name "gypsy moth" from the Society's Common Names of Insects and Related Organisms List as "hurtful to the Romani people", since gypsy is considered an ethnic slur by some Romani people, especially in the United States where the moth is widespread. This led the Society to select a replacement name through a consultative process. In January 2022, the Society proposed the name spongy moth, in reference to the spongy mass of the egg casing. A 16-member governing board voted to approve the new name in March 2022.

== Taxonomy ==
The European native, and introduced North American, L. dispar moths are considered to be the same subspecies, L. d. dispar. Confusion over the classification of species and subspecies exists. The U. S. Department of Agriculture defines the Asian subspecies as "any biotype of L. dispar possessing female flight capability", despite L. d. asiatica not being the only accepted subspecies that is capable of flight. Traditionally, L. dispar has been referred to as "gypsy moth" even when referring to Japanese, Indian and Asiatic populations.

=== Subspecies ===
Subspecies	Distribution	Identifying characteristics
L. d. dispar	Europe, western Asia and north Africa, introduced to Eastern North America	Females winged but flightless
L. d. asiatica	Eastern Asia, introduced to western North America and to Europe	Females winged and capable of flight; attracted to lights
L. d. japonica	All of Japan	Large males, very dark brown

The European subspecies (L. d. dispar) is native to temperate forests in western Europe. It had been introduced to the United States in 1869, and to Canada in 1912.

The Asian subspecies (L. d. asiatica) is native to temperate Asia east of the Ural mountains. Since the early 1990s it has also been detected along the West Coast of temperate North America. From Southern Europe it is spreading northwards into Germany and other countries, where it hybridizes with the European subspecies, L. d. dispar. A colony had been reported from Great Britain in 1995.

== Biological pest control measures ==
Lymantria dispar was introduced into North America by artist and astronomer Étienne Léopold Trouvelot in 1869, who imported it from Europe while looking for a source of silk to replace the shortage of cotton caused by the American Civil War. Since then, several species of parasitoids and predators have been introduced as biological control agents in attempts to help control this moth. Beginning in the late 1800s, at least ten species were established this way, but for nearly a century, there was little regulation or research on the effectiveness or non-target effects of these introduced natural enemies. Several were generalists that offered little control of L. dispar and attacked other native insects.

One such species is the tachinid fly Compsilura concinnata, which attacked many other host species (over 180 known hosts documented), laying waste many of the large moth species previously abundant in the Northeast. Another is the encyrtid wasp Ooencyrtus kuvanae which attacks L. dispar eggs but also parasitizes the eggs of other Lepidoptera species. The most effective control agents are microbial pathogens: the Lymantria dispar multicapsid nuclear polyhedrosis virus (LdmNPV) and the fungus Entomophaga maimaiga.

=== Status in the United States ===
In June 2024, Scientific American reported the severity of the outbreak in the northeastern and midwestern regions of the United States. Some places in these regions were experiencing one of the most severe outbreaks ever recorded. Some areas reported densities exceeding 2,500,000 caterpillars per hectare (1,000,000 per acre). Some regions have grappled with this issue for five consecutive years.

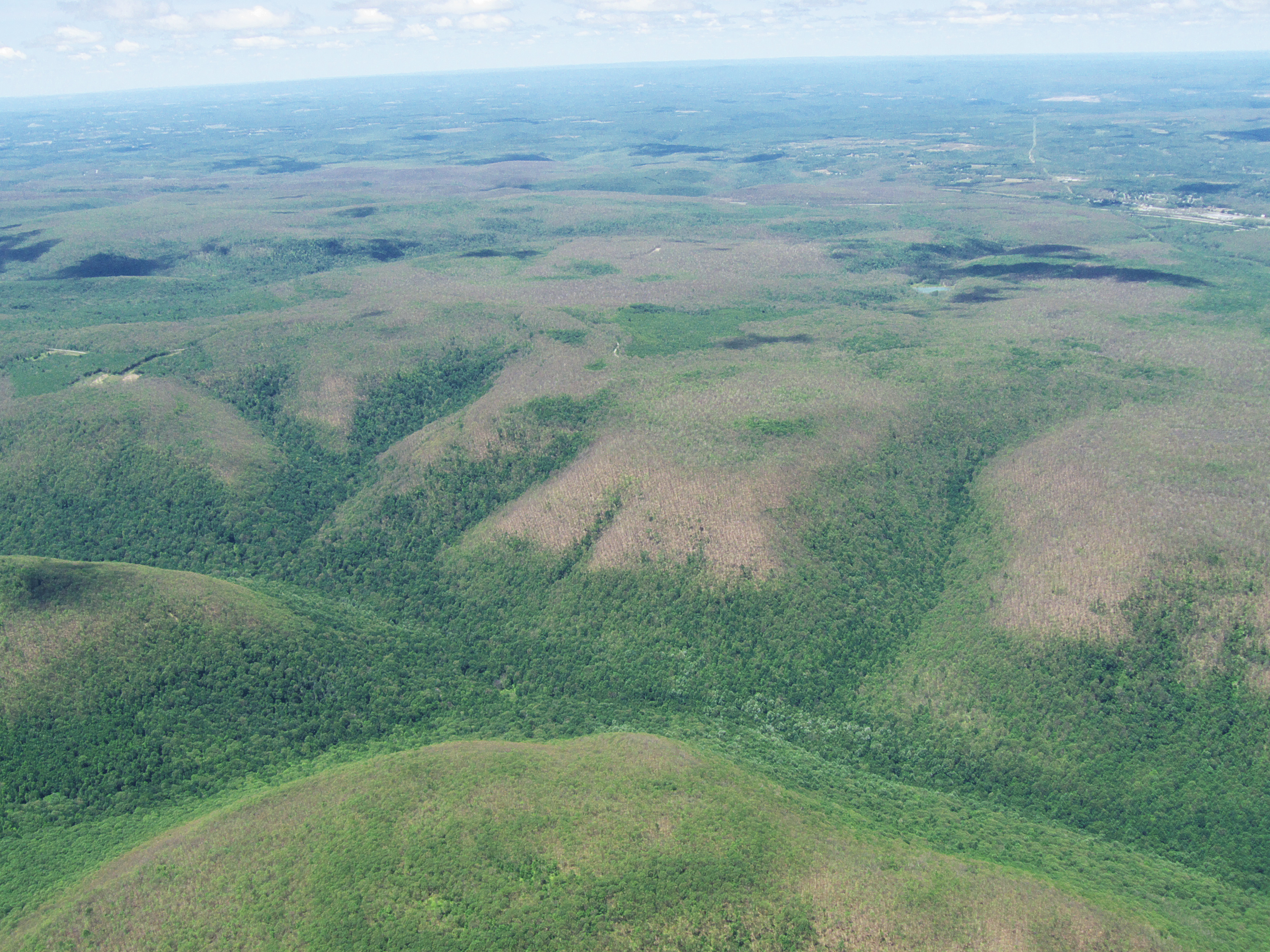
L. dispar defoliation along the Allegheny Front in Pennsylvania (July 2007)

Since the introduction of the species to North America, L. dispar has caused significant ecological damage. Its range has expanded at an average rate of 21 km (13 mi) per year, resulting in the cumulative defoliation of 33,000,000 ha (82,000,000 acres) of forest from 1970 to 2013. The U.S. Forest Service allocates an average annual budget of $30 million toward control efforts. However, climate change has contributed to longer outbreak cycles, which typically occur every eight to twelve years. This has led to a more frequent and severe impact on the environment.

Defoliation by L. dispar triggers chemical defenses in quaking aspen, rendering them unfit host trees for Polyphemus moths, posing an additional threat to that species' conservation.

== See also ==
- Lymantria dispar dispar
- Lymantria dispar in the United States
- Spongy moth in New Zealand
