= WCSB =

WCSB may refer to:

- WCSB (FM), a radio station (89.3 FM) licensed to serve Cleveland, Ohio, United States
- WCSB, Grahm Junior College radio station and a closed-circuit television station ("Cambridge school of Broadcasting")
- Western Canadian Sedimentary Basin
- Western conifer seed bug
