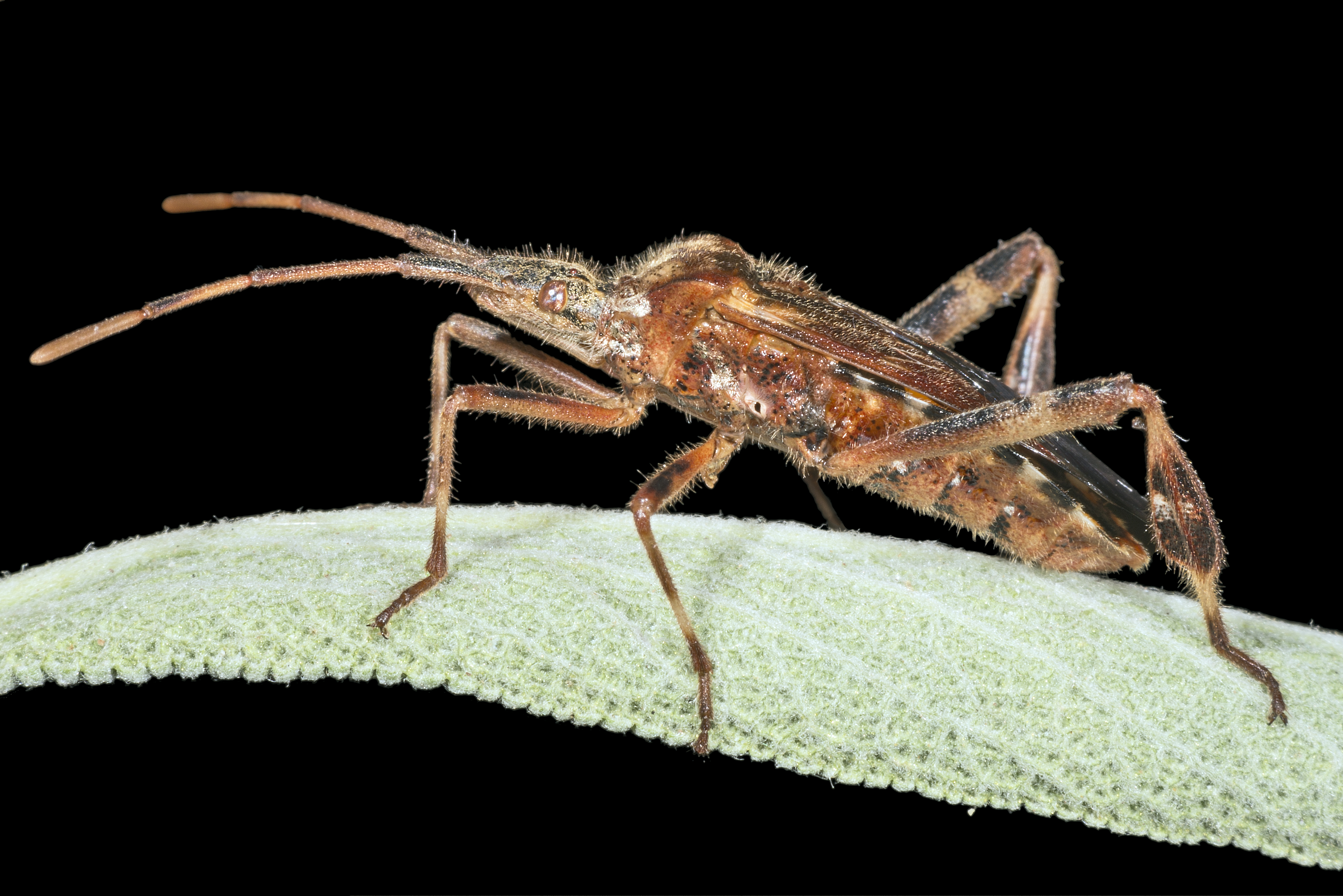
- Leptoglossus occidentalis
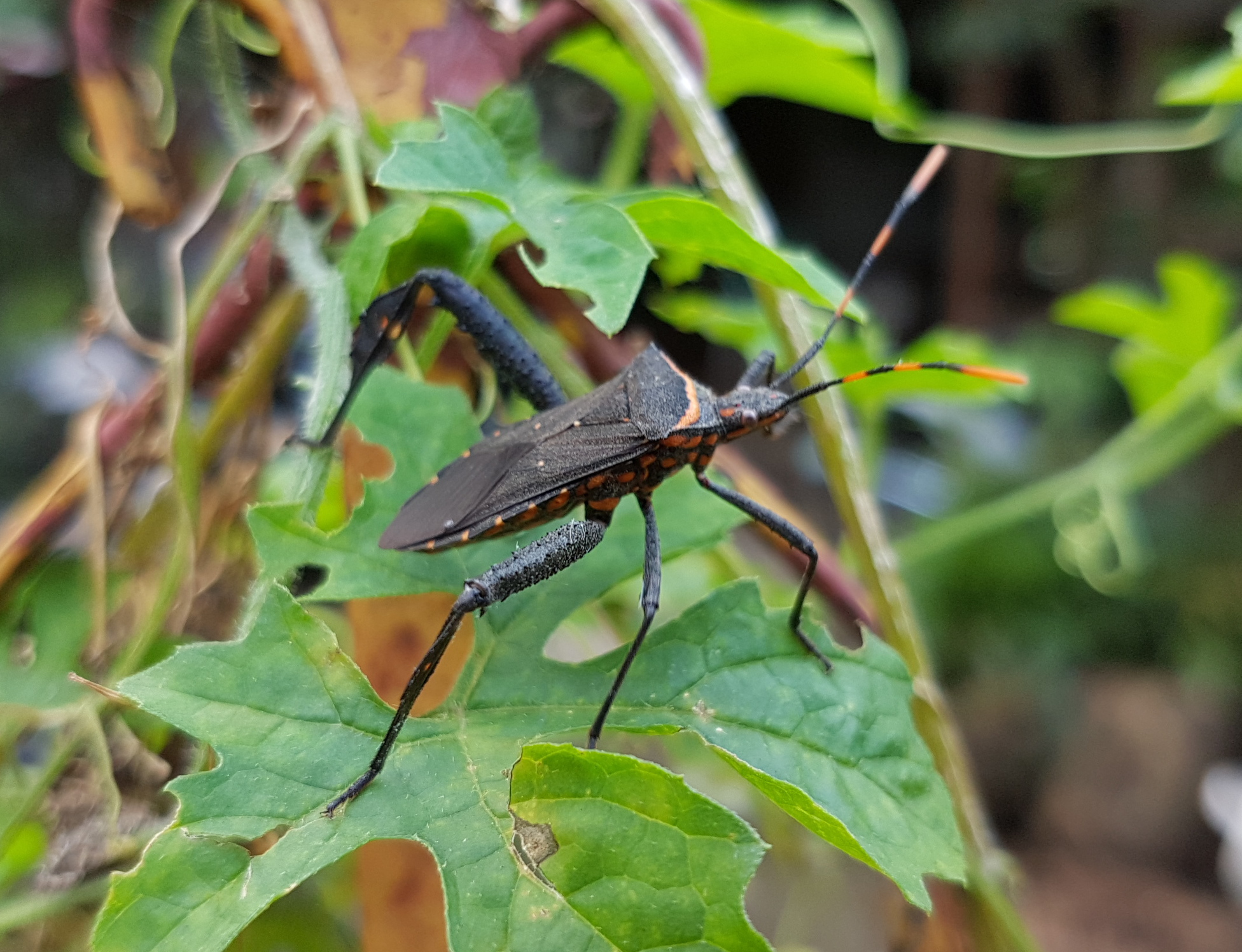
- Leptoglossus gonagra

Scientific classification
- Kingdom: Animalia
- Phylum: Arthropoda
- Clade: Pancrustacea
- Class: Insecta
- Order: Hemiptera
- Suborder: Heteroptera
- Family: Coreidae
- Tribe: Anisoscelini
- Genus: Leptoglossus; Guérin-Méneville, 1831

Species
- 61 described species and one described subspecies (see text)

Synonyms
- Fabrictilis Osuna, 1984; Haeckelia Kirkaldy, 1904; Hypselonotus Hahn, 1826; Microphyllia Stål, 1870; Nannophyllia Bergroth, 1913; Stalifera Osuna, 1984; Theognis Stål, 1862; Theonoe Philippi, 1865; Veneza Osuna, 1984

= Leptoglossus =

Genus of true bugs

Leptoglossus is a genus of true bugs in the leaf-footed bug family and the tribe Anisoscelini. Species are distributed throughout the Americas, with some records in eastern & southern Asia and Europe (mostly introductions).Like members of some other genera in the family, these bugs have leaflike dilations of the hind tibia.

== Behavior ==
=== Sexual dimorphism and courtship ===
Species Leptoglossus australis engage in sexual dimorphism by the functional morphology of their femurs. Members of L. australis sexes vary based on length, width, and number of spines on their femur. In males, it is most common for the widest part of their femur to be located at the third spine, while in females the widest part of their femur is commonly located at the third spine.

Variation of L. australis additionally lies in the length of the femur, where the males have a larger femoral length compared to the females. The enlarged femur in males is used as a weapon in male contests as a form of courtship.

Species Leptoglossus phyllopus engages in sexual dimorphism using a ventral abdominal gland only found in sexually mature males. This gland would excrete a yellow-brown fluid when extended and is only present in sexually active males, which will eventually be lost when the male is no longer sexually active.

=== Symbionts ===
Species Leptoglossus zonatus and Leptoglossus phyllopus engage in symbiotic relationships with the pathogenic bacteria, Burkholderia. Species which have the symbiotic bacteria experienced a higher fitness and were larger compared to species without the symbiont. Burkholderia is not transmitted through reproduction, so offspring of Leptoglossus must find and consume the bacteria. This is done by ingesting soil containing Burkholderia, where the symbiont will colonize in the midgut region. Despite the advantage Burkholderia provides to Leptoglossus, it is currently unknown what the bacteria provides to cause this increase in fitness.

=== Feeding and diet ===
Species Leptoglossus occidentalis is famous for feeding coniferous tree seeds in mountain regions throughout the globe. At maturity, L. occidentalis diet shifts towards ripe fruits, such as blackberries. Feeding is accomplished by salivary enzymes ejected from their stylets then sucking out the nutrients. The consumption of coniferous seeds has caused a reported 83% decrease in lodgepole pine seeds, making L. occidentalis an economic pest.

== Economy ==
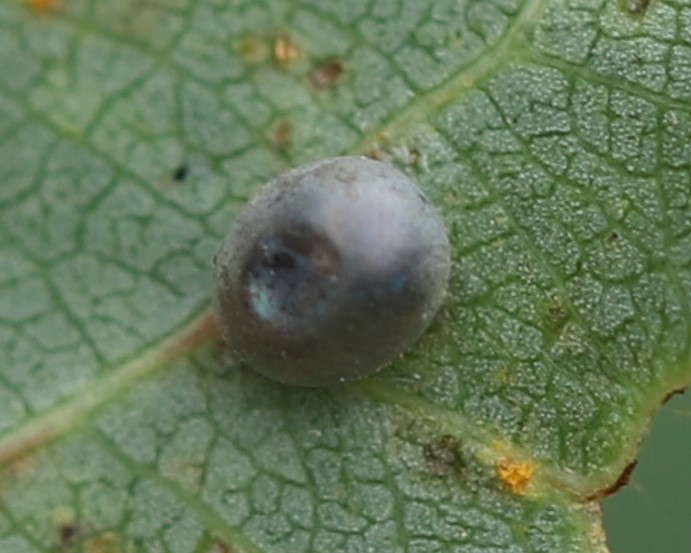
Moth egg parasitized by Anastatus bifasciatus, a common egg parasite of Leptoglossus occidentalis.

When a tree gets consumed by L. occidentalis, germination capabilities of coniferous seeds become drastically reduced. In southwestern French seed orchards, the economic damage was less than 25%, but for natural alpine pine seeds there was a 70% impact. Studies have confirmed that there is damage patterns with mature cone seeds, making L. occidentalis a predator to seed orchards. Attempts have been made to combat L. occidentalis, such as using predators of Leptoglossus, ants or orthopterans, to hunt them. Another attempt was to use species that can parasitize Leptoglossus eggs, such as Anastatus bifasciatus and Ooencyrtus. The parasitic species appeared to be efficient at reducing the Leptoglossus population, but not effective enough to fully suppress L. occidentalis.

== Species ==
The current list of described species and subspecies includes:

- L. absconditus Brailovsky & Barrera
- L. alatus (Walker)
- L. arenalensis Brailovsky & Barrera
- L. ashmeadi Heidemann
- L. balteatus (Linnaeus)
- L. brevirostris Barber
- L. caicosensis Brailovsky & Barrera
- L. cartogoensis Brailovsky & Barrera
- L. chilensis (Spinola)
- L. chilensis chilensis (Spinola)
- L. concaviusculus Berg
- L. cinctus (Herrich-Schaeffer)
- L. clypealis Heidemann
- L. concolor (Walker)
- L. confusus Alayo & Grillo
- L. conspersus Stål
- L. corculus (Say)
- L. crassicornus (Dallas)
- L. crestalis Brailovsky & Barrera
- L. dearmasi Alayo & Grillo
- L. dentatus Berg
- L. dialeptus Brailovsky & Barrera
- L. digitiformis Brailovsky & Barrera
- L. dilaticollis Guérin-Méneville - type species (Central & South America)
- L. egeri Brailovsky
- L. fasciatus (Westwood)
- L. fasciolatus (Stål)
- L. flavosignatus Blöte
- L. frankei Brailovsky
- L. fulvicornis (Westwood)
- L. gonagra (Fabricius)
- L. grenadensis Allen
- L. harpagon (Fabricius)
- L. hesperus Brailovsky & Couturier
- L. humeralis Allen
- L. impensus Brailovsky
- L. impictipennis Stål
- L. impictus (Stål)
- L. ingens (Mayr)
- L. jacquelinae Brailovsky
- L. katiae Schaefer & Packauskas
- L. lambayaquinus Brailovsky & Barrera
- L. lineosus (Stål)
- L. lonchoides Allen
- L. macrophyllus Stål
- L. manausensis Brailovsky & Barrera
- L. neovexillatus Allen
- L. nigropearlei Yonke
- L. occidentalis Heidemann
- L. oppositus (Say)
- L. pallidivenosus Allen
- L. phyllopus (Linnaeus)
- L. polychromus Brailovsky
- L. quadricollis (Westwood)
- L. rubrescens (Walker)
- L. sabanensis Brailovsky & Barrera
- L. stigma (Herbst)
- L. subauratus Distant
- L. talamancanus Brailovsky & Barrera
- L. tetranotatus Brailovsky & Barrera
- L. usingeri Yonke
- L. venustus Alayo & Grillo
- L. zonatus (Dallas)
