= Bolkan =

Bolkan is a surname.

Notable people with the name include:

- Florinda Bolkan (born 1941), Brazilian model and actress
- Hasan Bolkan, American microbiologist
- Simen Bolkan Nordli (born 1999), Norwegian association footballer

== See also ==
- Balkan (disambiguation)
