= Oppositus =

Oppositus is a Latin term meaning opposite.

Oppositus (situs inversus or situs transversus) is a condition in humans and animals in which an individual's internal organs are reversed left to right (or "mirrored") from their usual locations.

Oppositus is also used in the names of many species, including:

- Charniodiscus oppositus, an extinct primitive marine animal.
- Leptoglossus oppositus, a leaf-footed bug.
- Molophilus oppositus, a crane fly.
