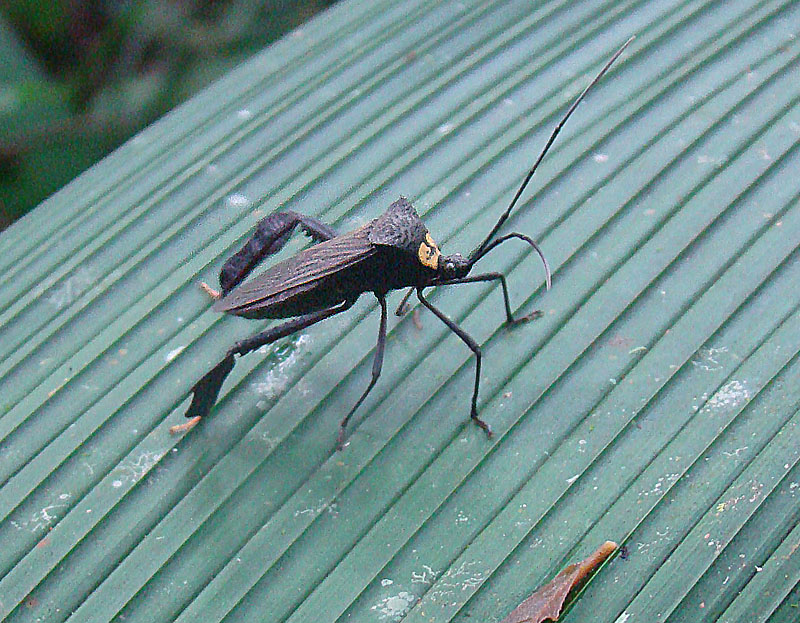

Scientific classification
- Domain: Eukaryota
- Kingdom: Animalia
- Phylum: Arthropoda
- Class: Insecta
- Order: Hemiptera
- Suborder: Heteroptera
- Family: Coreidae
- Tribe: Anisoscelini
- Genus: Leptoglossus
- Species: L. brevirostris

Binomial name
- Leptoglossus brevirostris Barber, 1918

= Leptoglossus brevirostris =

Species of true bug

Leptoglossus brevirostris is a species of leaf-footed bug in the family Coreidae. It is found in Central America and North America.
