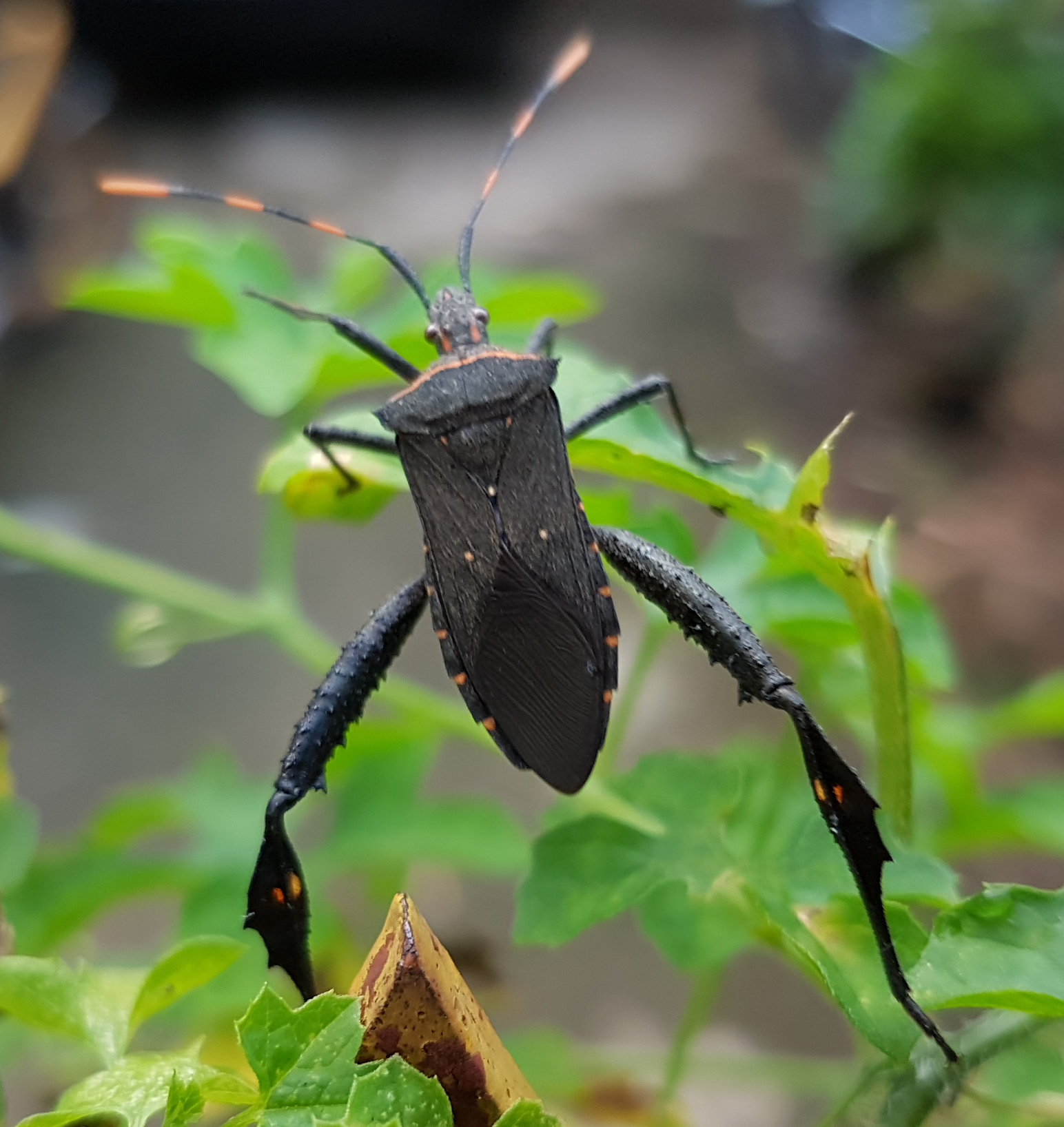

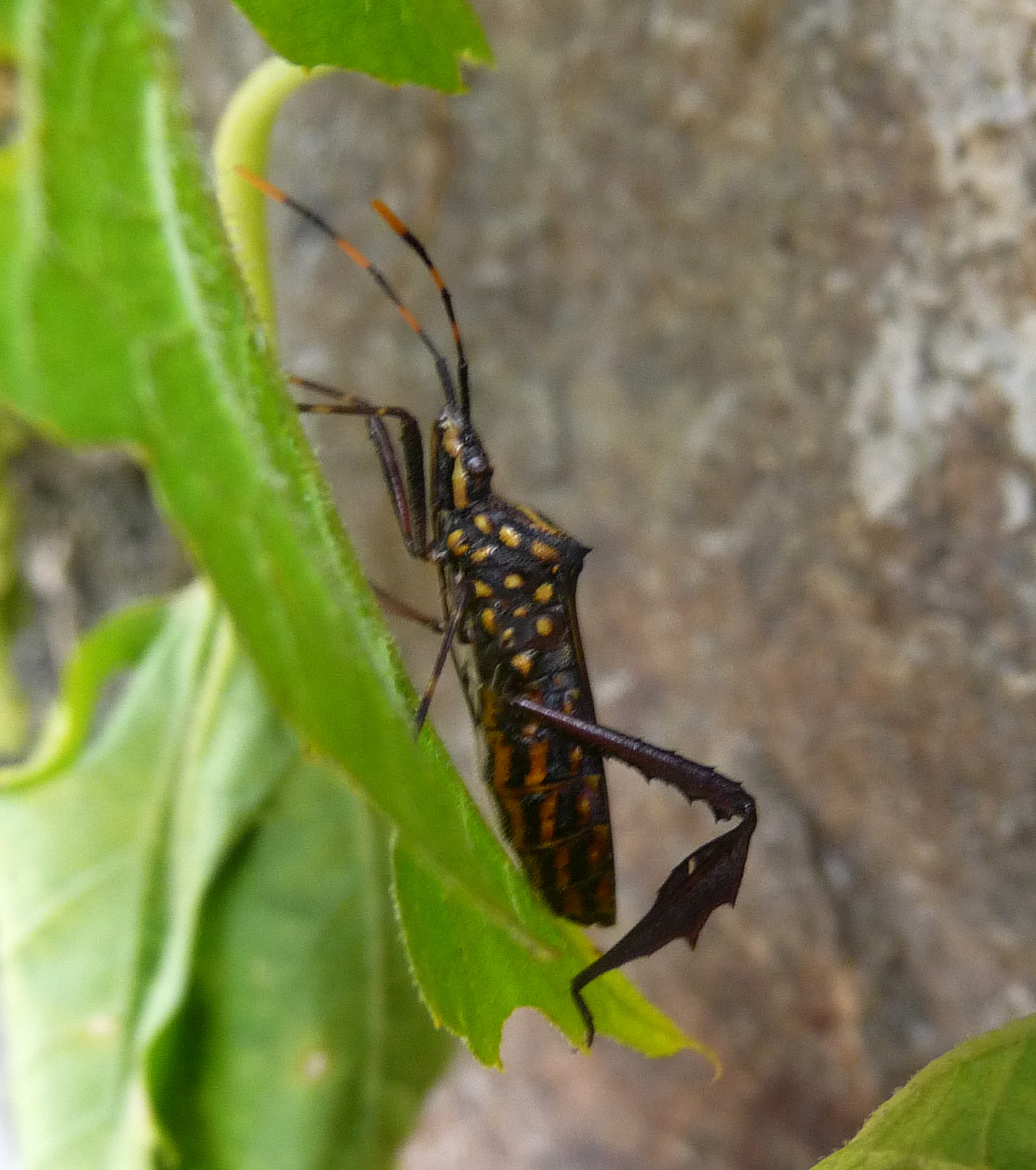

Scientific classification
- Domain: Eukaryota
- Kingdom: Animalia
- Phylum: Arthropoda
- Class: Insecta
- Order: Hemiptera
- Suborder: Heteroptera
- Family: Coreidae
- Genus: Leptoglossus
- Species: L. gonagra

Binomial name
- Leptoglossus gonagra (Fabricius, 1775)

Synonyms
- Fabrictilis australis (Fabricius); Fabrictilis gonagra (Fabricius); Leptoglossus australis (Fabricius); Leptoglossus membranaceus (Fabricius); Theognis gonagra; Theogonis gonagra

= Leptoglossus gonagra =

Species of insect

Leptoglossus gonagra, known as the passionvine bug, citron bug or squash bug in different parts of its range, is a species of leaf-footed bug in the family Coreidae. It is found in Africa, the Caribbean, Central America, North America, South America, Southern Asia, the Pacific Ocean and Oceania.

== Description ==
This leaf-footed plant bug is elongated and about 18 mm (0.7 in) long and 6 mm (0.2 in) wide. The long antennae are banded in black and orange, and there is a pale orangish transverse band at the front of the broad plate covering the prothorax. The remaining surface is dark brown or a dull purplish-black, with small orange spots on the underside of the thorax and abdomen, and a pair of orange spots on the two rear, enlarged, flattened tibiae.

== Distribution and host range ==
Leptoglossus gonagra is found in much of sub-Saharan Africa, southern Asia, the Pacific area, northern Australia, North, Central and South America and the Caribbean area. Its host range includes mung beans, navy beans, cowpeas, legumes, passion fruit, cacao, coffee, avocado, macadamia, mango, cashew, citrus, pomegranate and cucurbits.

== Life cycle ==
The female attaches chains of about 16 eggs in lines to twigs or stems of the host plant. These hatch after about a week and the nymphs moult five times as they grow. They are similar in appearance to the adults but are reddish when young with dark spines on head and thorax. They cluster together at first but later disperse more widely around the plant. Both adults and nymphs suck sap from the cells of the host plant, injecting toxic saliva, and this may cause the shoot to shrivel. Nymphal development takes about seven weeks and the whole life cycle takes nine or ten weeks. Females may lay a total of around sixty eggs and live for several weeks.
