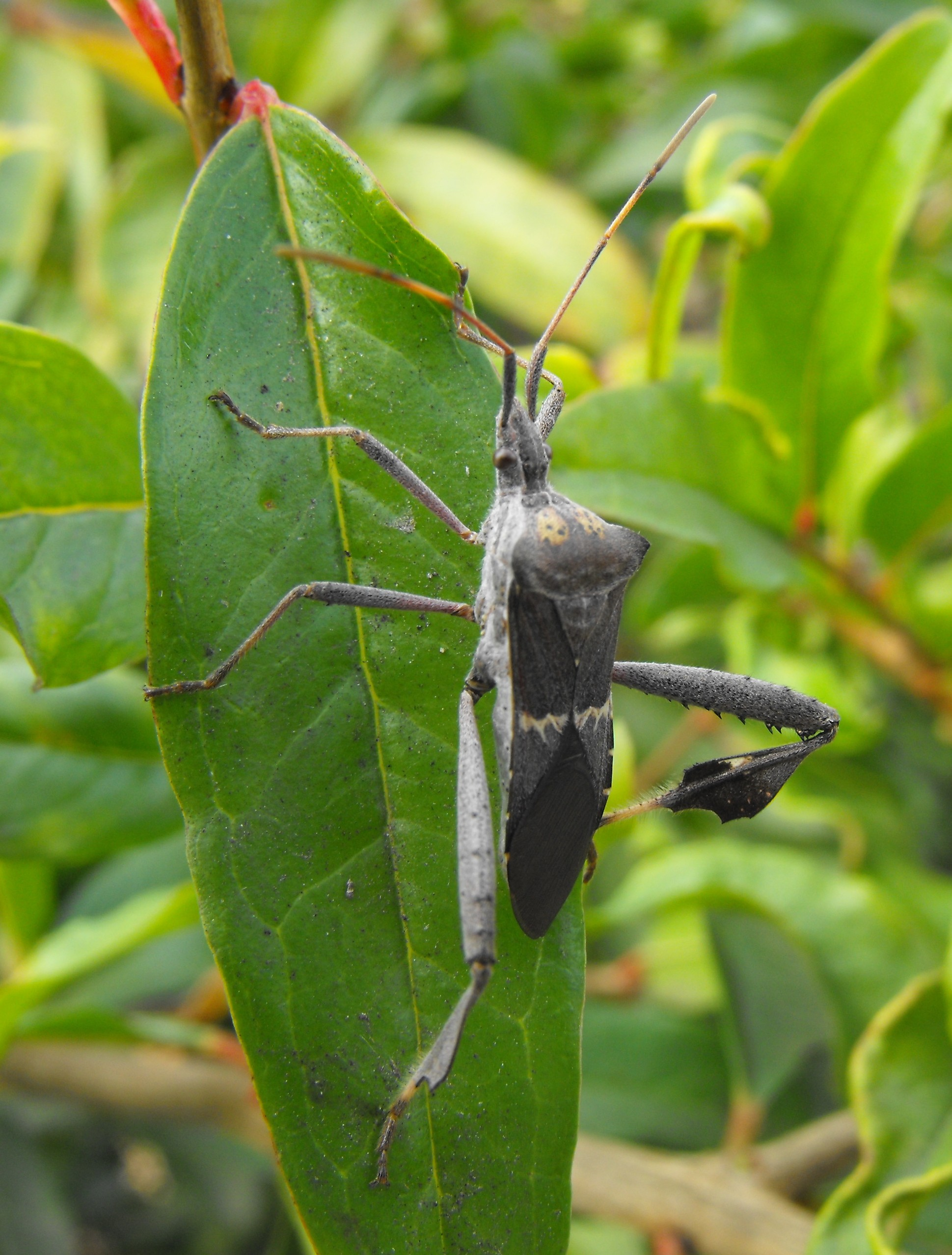

Scientific classification
- Kingdom: Animalia
- Phylum: Arthropoda
- Class: Insecta
- Order: Hemiptera
- Suborder: Heteroptera
- Family: Coreidae
- Genus: Leptoglossus
- Species: L. zonatus

Binomial name
- Leptoglossus zonatus (Dallas, 1852)

= Leptoglossus zonatus =

Species of true bug

Leptoglossus zonatus is a species of leaf-footed bug, a type of true bugs. It is found throughout much of South America, Central America, Mexico, and the southwestern United States. The bug is two centimeters in length, gray in color, with a zigzagging whitish band across its back and two distinctive yellowish spots on its anterior pronotum, the identifying characteristic for the species.

This leaf-footed bug is one of the two major pests of physic nut plants in Nicaragua. In Honduras, where the bug is known commonly as chinche patona (large-legged bug), it is a minor garden pest. It is a pest of many crops in Brazil and it may transmit the plant pathogen Herpetomonas macgheei, a trypanosomatid protozoan. It breeds in pomegranate and desert willow trees, and the gregarious bright orange nymphs aggregate there. It is a serious pest of satsuma oranges in Louisiana, causing damage by feeding and by transmitting the pathogenic yeast Nematospora coryli.

Biological pest control agents found to be effective against this insect include the entomopathogenic fungus Beauveria bassiana.

== Gallery ==
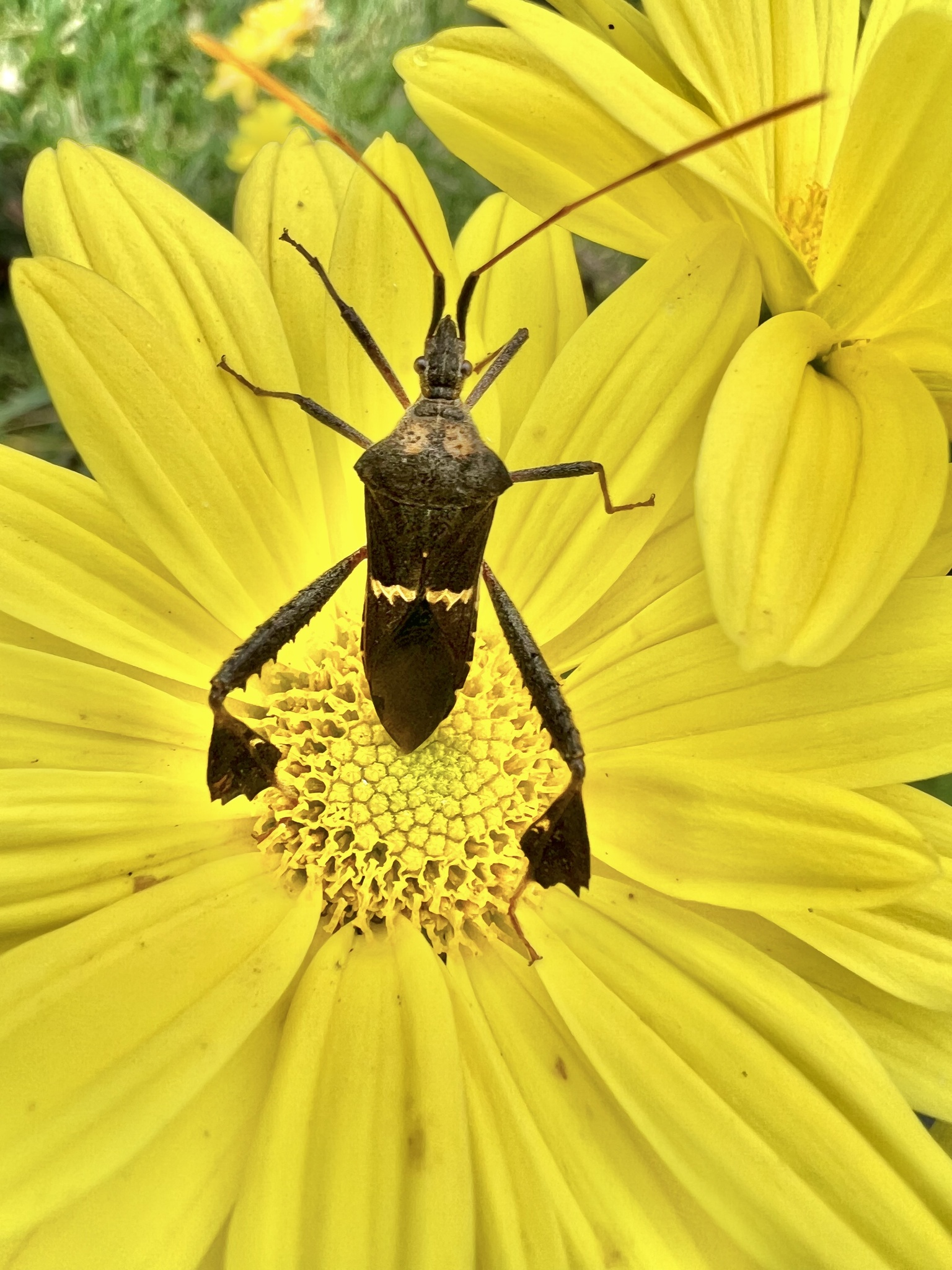
Imago

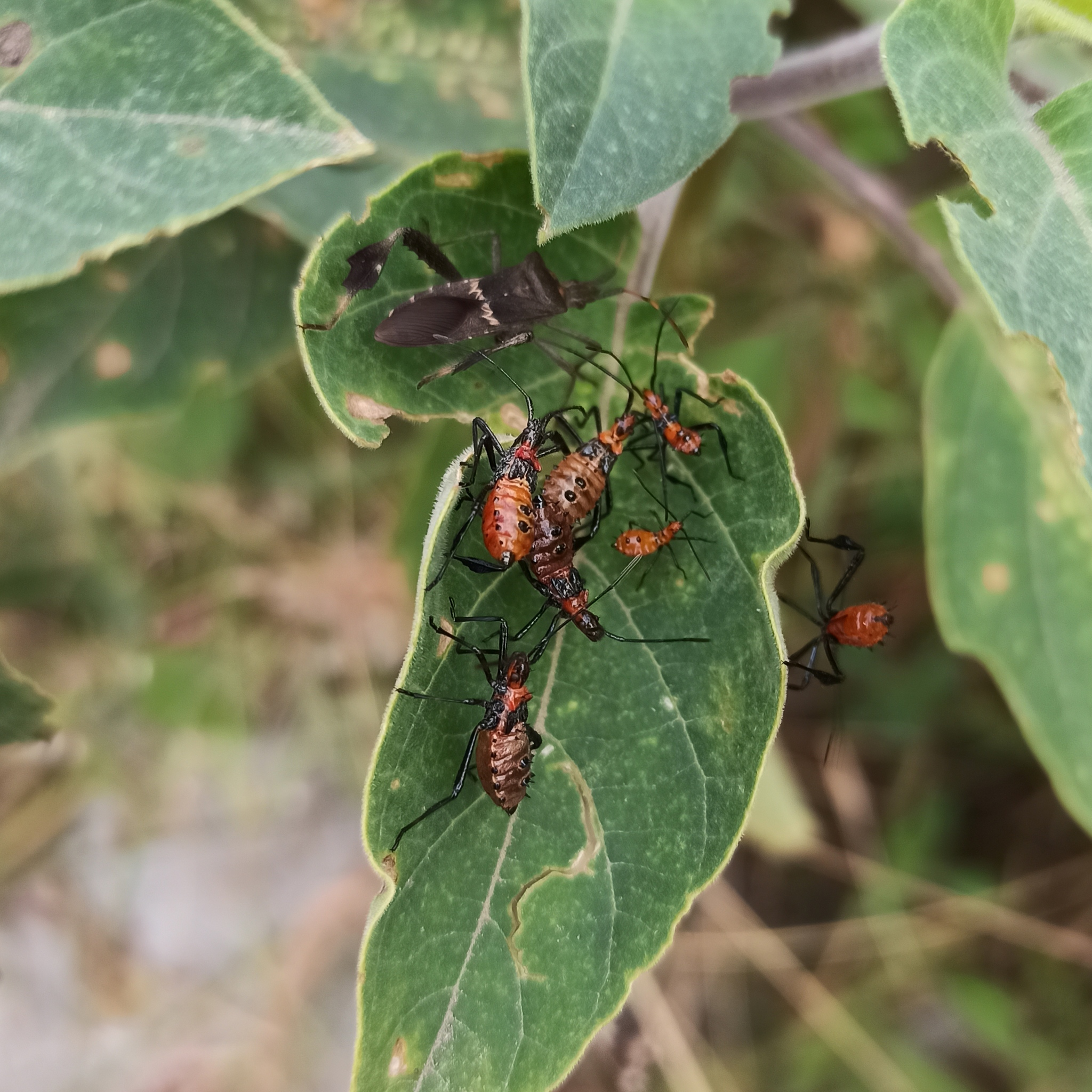
Nymph
