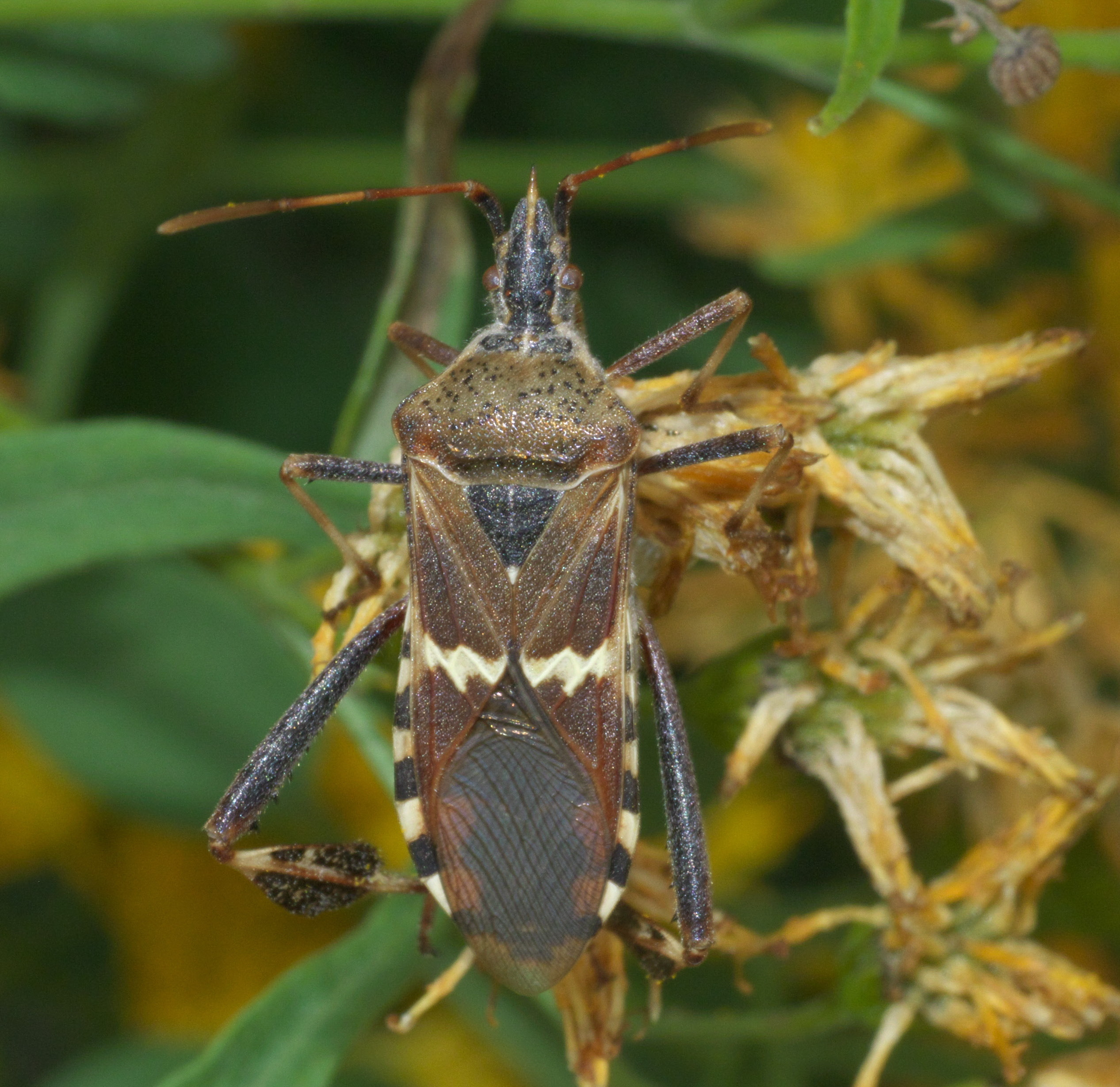

Scientific classification
- Domain: Eukaryota
- Kingdom: Animalia
- Phylum: Arthropoda
- Class: Insecta
- Order: Hemiptera
- Suborder: Heteroptera
- Family: Coreidae
- Tribe: Anisoscelini
- Genus: Leptoglossus
- Species: L. clypealis

Binomial name
- Leptoglossus clypealis Heidemann, 1910

= Leptoglossus clypealis =

Species of true bug

Leptoglossus clypealis, the western leaf-footed bug, is a species of leaf-footed bug in the family Coreidae. It is found in Central America and North America. Adult L. clypealis are 18–19 millimetres (0.71–0.75 in) in length. They are brown with flared, leaf-like expansions near their feet and a pale band across their wings.

L. clypealis is commonly found on juniper, but can be a pest to agricultural crops. In the 1980s, Hasan Bolkan discovered that the leaf-footed bug was a cause of lesions on commercially produced pistachio crops.

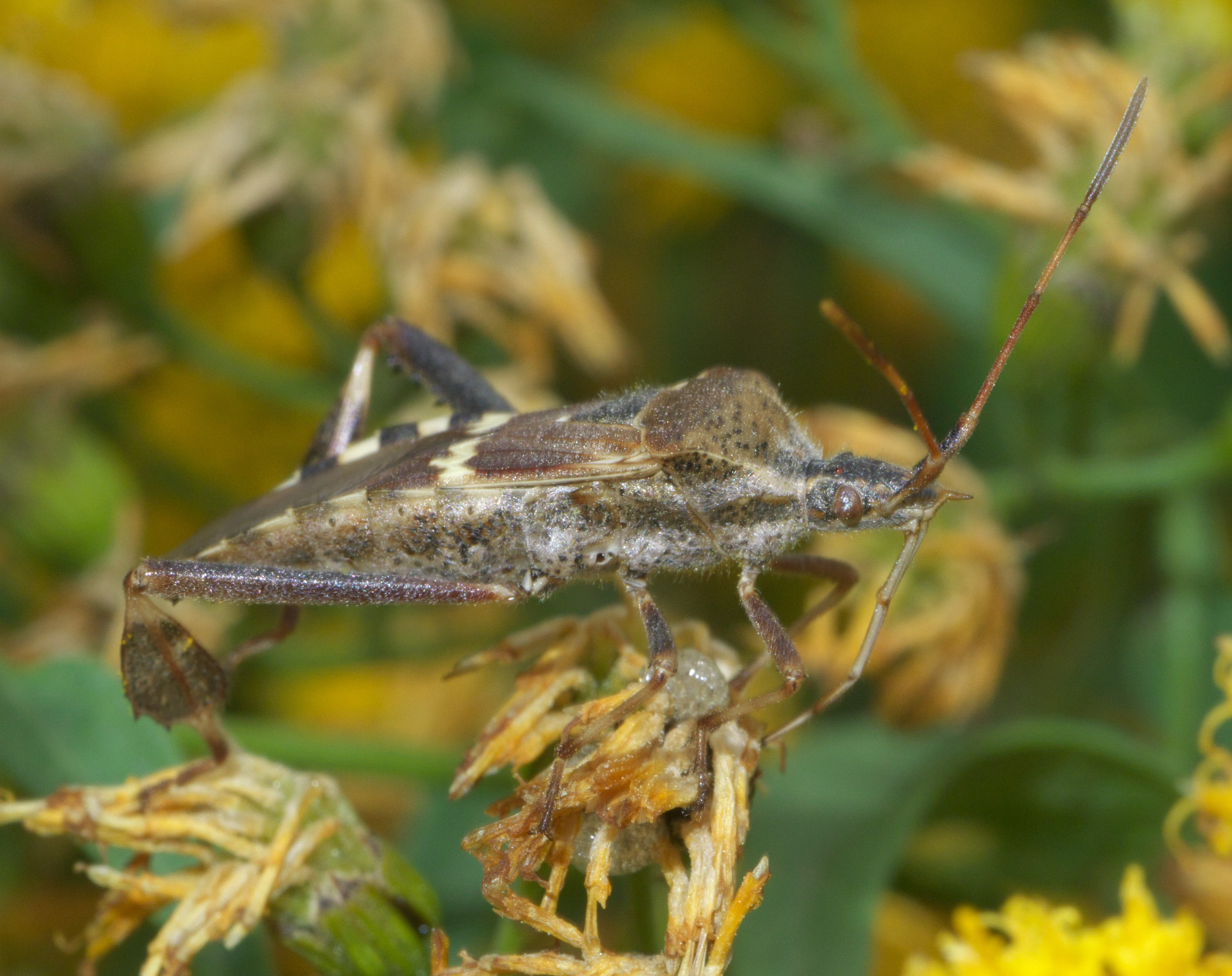
Western leaf-footed bug, Leptoglossus clypealis
