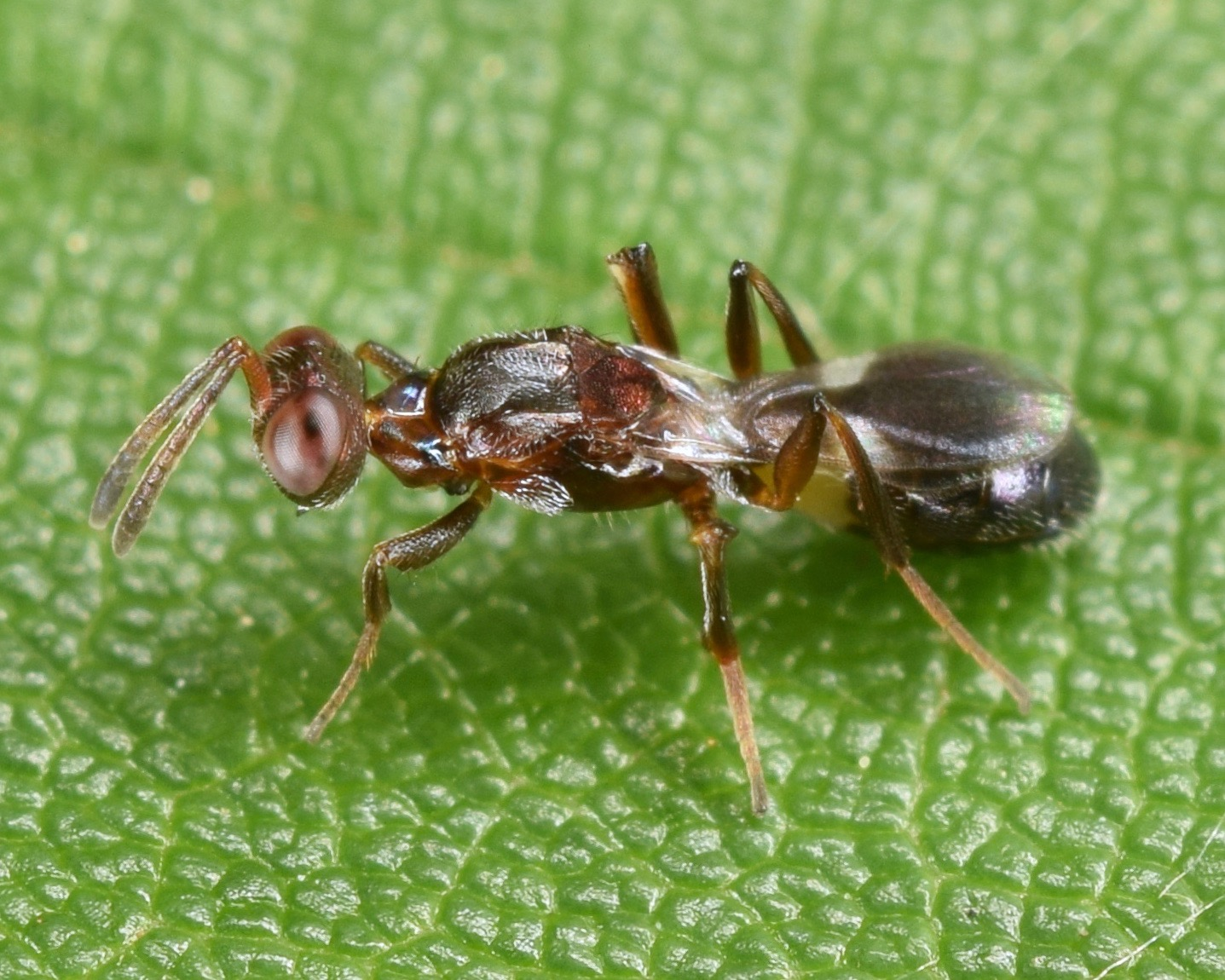
- Unidentified Anastatus species

Scientific classification
- Domain: Eukaryota
- Kingdom: Animalia
- Phylum: Arthropoda
- Class: Insecta
- Order: Hymenoptera
- Family: Eupelmidae
- Genus: Anastatus; Motschulsky, 1859

Type species
- Podagrion mantoidae Motschulsky, 1859

Synonyms
- Anastatimorpha Erdos, 1957; Antigaster Walsh & Riley, 1869; Cacotropia Motschulsky, 1863; Cerycium Erdos, 1946; Cladanastatus Boucek, 1979; Descampsia Risbec, 1955; Misochoris Rondani, 1877; Misocoris Rondani, 1877; Paraguaya Girault, 1911; Parasolindenia Girault, 1913; Paravignalia Risbec, 1951; Parooderella Girault, 1913; Proanastatus De Santis, 1952; Pseudanastatus Masi, 1917; Pseudooderella Brethes, 1922; Solindenia Cameron, 1883; Vignalia Risbec, 1951

= Anastatus =

Genus of wasps

Anastatus is a large genus of parasitic wasps belonging to the family Eupelmidae.

The genus has cosmopolitan distribution.

== Species ==
- Anastatus absonus Narendran, 2009
- Anastatus acherontiae Narayanan, Subba Rao & Ramachandra, 1960
- Anastatus adamsi Yoshimoto & Ishii, 1965
- Anastatus aereicorpus Girault, 1925
- Anastatus alaredactus Narendran, 2009
- Anastatus bifasciatus (Geoffroy, 1785)
- Anastatus biproruli (Girault, 1925)
- Anastatus catalonicus Bolivar y Pieltain, 1935
- Anastatus disparis Ruschka, 1921
- Anastatus dexingtensis Sheng & Wang, 1997
- Anastatus echidna (Motschulsky, 1863)
- Anastatus flavipes Sheng & Wang, 1997
- Anastatus formosanus Crawford, 1913
- Anastatus fulloi Sheng & Wang, 1997
- Anastatus huangi Sheng & Yu, 1998
- Anastatus mantoidae Motschulsky, 1859
- Anastatus orientalis Yang and Choi, 2015
