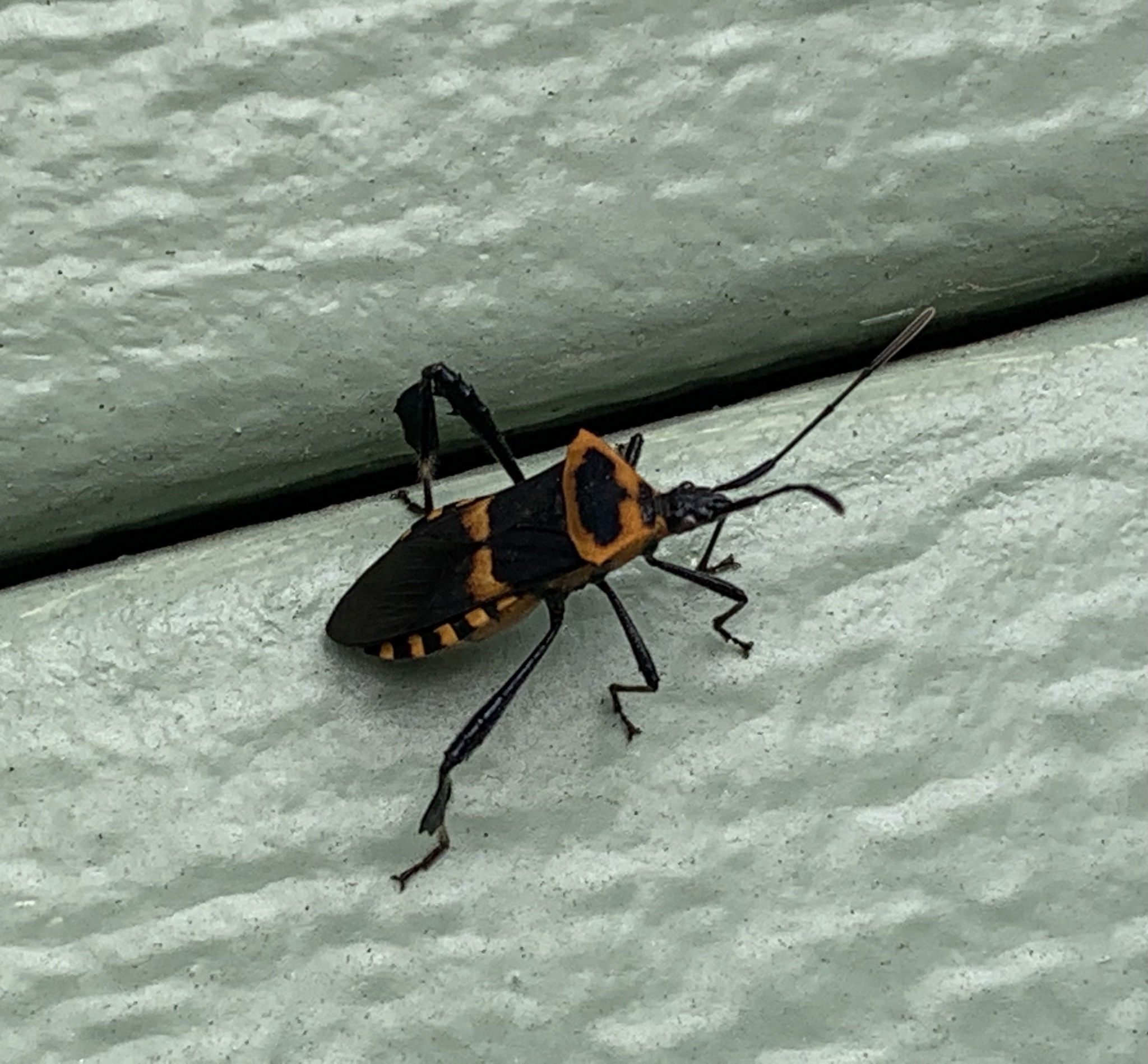

Scientific classification
- Domain: Eukaryota
- Kingdom: Animalia
- Phylum: Arthropoda
- Class: Insecta
- Order: Hemiptera
- Suborder: Heteroptera
- Family: Coreidae
- Tribe: Anisoscelini
- Genus: Leptoglossus
- Species: L. ashmeadi

Binomial name
- Leptoglossus ashmeadi Heidemann, 1909

= Leptoglossus ashmeadi =

Species of insect

Leptoglossus ashmeadi is a species of leaf-footed bug in the family Coreidae. It is found in North America.
