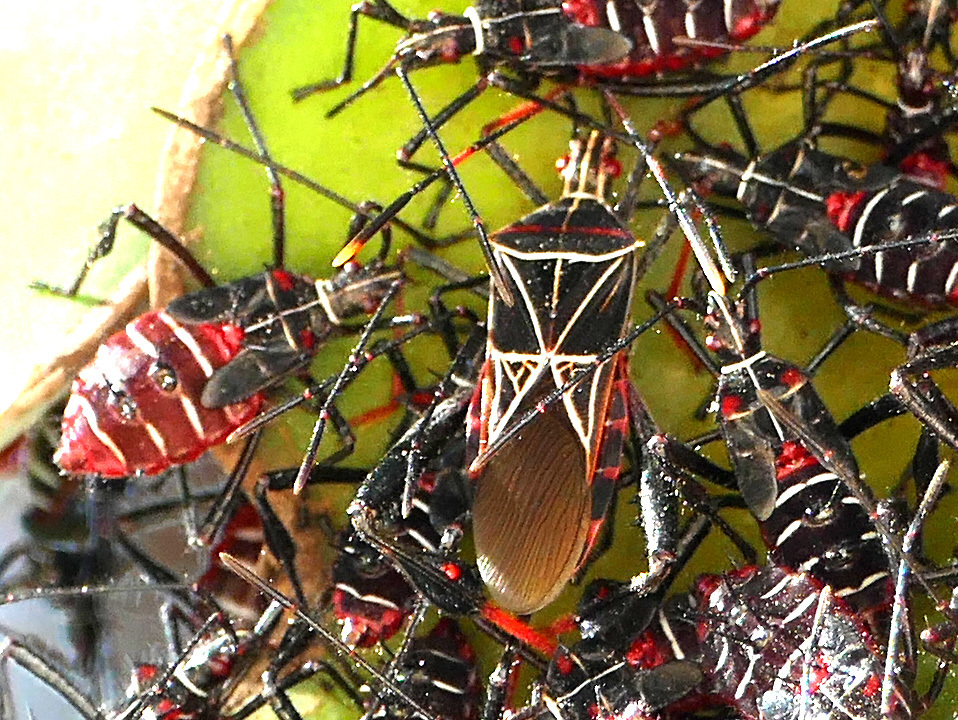
- Leptoglossus lineosus adult and nymphs

Scientific classification
- Kingdom: Animalia
- Phylum: Arthropoda
- Clade: Pancrustacea
- Class: Insecta
- Order: Hemiptera
- Suborder: Heteroptera
- Family: Coreidae
- Genus: Leptoglossus
- Species: L. lineosus

Binomial name
- Leptoglossus lineosus (Stål, 1862)

Synonyms
- Anisoscelis lineosus Stål, 1862; Theognis lineosus Stål, 1862

= Leptoglossus lineosus =

Species of flowering plant

Leptoglossus lineosus is one of many species known as "leaf-footed bugs" belonging in the order of "half-winged" bugs, the Hemiptera, the suborder Heteroptera, and the family of the Coreidae.

== Description ==
Adults of Leptoglossus lineosus are easily distinguished from other Leptoglossus species by this combination of features:

- Slender, white lines form a striking X across the mostly black back, the X geometrically defined by the hypotenuses of four right-angled triangles
- Atop the broad, mostly black prothorax directly behind the head (the pronotum), there's a narrow ochre or reddish line running from side to side, about as slender as the antennae.
- The first antenna segment (closest to the head) is totally black, with other segments two-colored with strongly contrasting pale and dark areas.
- On the front legs' wing-like "tibial dilations" the inside dilation margin bears three low, hard-to-see points, while the outside ones' margins are smooth.

== Distribution ==
As seen on the iNaturalist map registering observations of Leptoglossus lineosus, the species is shown to be endemic just to Mexico, mainly in the central uplands. Also a disjunct population occurs in Mexico's northern Yucatan Peninsula.

== Habitat ==
At the iNaturalist website nearly all the photos documenting Leptoglossus lineosus in their natural environment shows individuals on cactus species. Mostly they're on pricklypear cacti of the genus Opuntia, though images on this page show adults and nymphs on a Selenicereus undatus cactus growing as an ornamental in a residential tree.

== As an agricultural pest ==
Leptoglossus lineosus has been described as a potential pest on climbing species of Hylocereus cacti grown in Mexican family gardens and commercially for use in pharmaceuticals, food and cosmetics. On Hylocereus the bug causes chlorotic spots, rot, dead parts and drying out of the plant.

== Taxonomy ==
The species Leptoglossus lineosus was first described under the name Theognis lineosus by the Swedish entomologist Carl Stål in 1862, in his "Hemiptera mexicana."

Some authors recognize the "Complex Leptoglossus lineosus", apparently lumping the species Leptoglossus lineosus with Leptoglossus talamancanus and Leptoglossus subauratus, species largely distinguished from one another by their geographical location and minor color variations and thickness of the line running across the otherwise black pronotum. The Complex's distribution is reckoned to extend from central Mexico south into Costa Rica and perhaps farther.

== Etymology ==
In the genus name Leptoglossus, the Lepto- is from New Latin meaning "small, weak, thin, fine"; the Latin was borrowed from the ancient Greek leptos, which literally meant "peeled, husked." The -glossus is New Latin borrowed from Greek glôssa, meaning "tongue." Thus "thin tongue," likely referring to the bug's slender proboscis.

The species name lineosus is the masculine form of the Latin adjective for "linear," probably referring to the striking white lines on the adult bug's mostly black back.

== Gallery ==
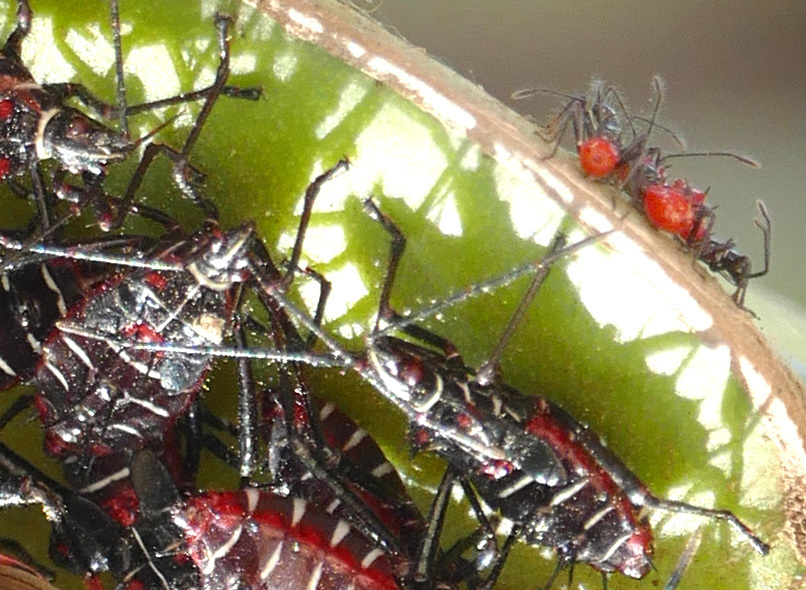
Leptoglossus lineosus nymphs in various stages

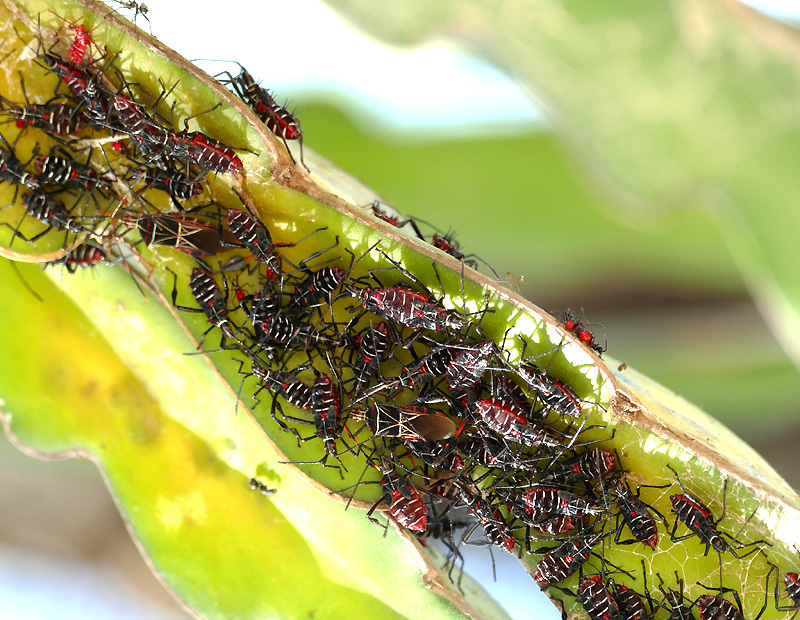
Leptoglossus lineosus nymphs and adults on Selenicereus undatus cactus
