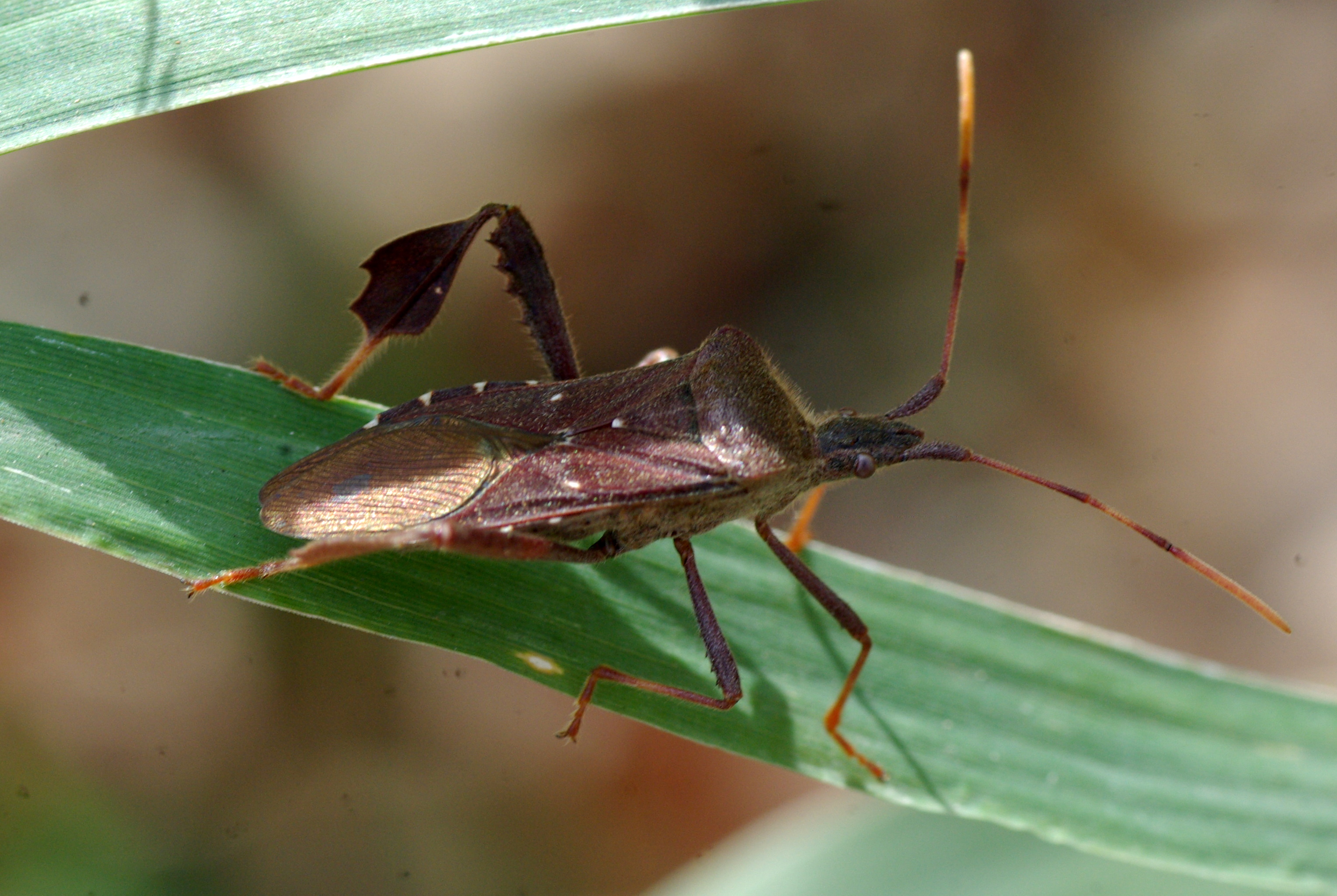

Scientific classification
- Domain: Eukaryota
- Kingdom: Animalia
- Phylum: Arthropoda
- Class: Insecta
- Order: Hemiptera
- Suborder: Heteroptera
- Family: Coreidae
- Genus: Leptoglossus
- Species: L. oppositus

Binomial name
- Leptoglossus oppositus (Say, 1832)

= Leptoglossus oppositus =

Species of true bug

Leptoglossus oppositus a species of leaf-footed bug (family Coreidae) found in North America. It resembles Leptoglossus fulvicornis but can be distinguished by the deeper scallops in the leaf-like feature of the hind tibia and the addition of three white spots across the hemelytra. This species is widely dispersed from New York to Florida and as far west as Iowa and Minnesota, as well as the southwest regions of the United States into Mexico.
