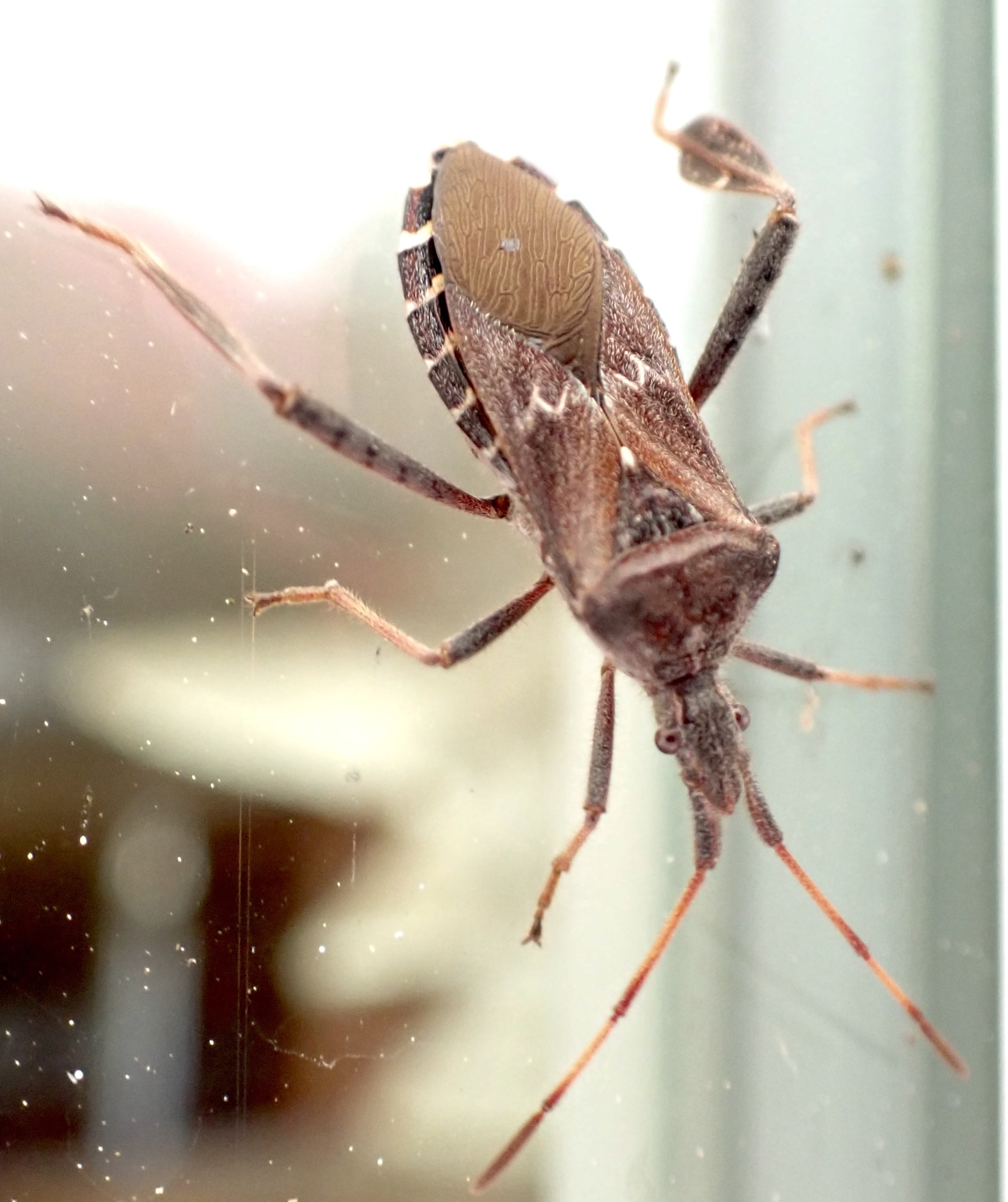

Scientific classification
- Domain: Eukaryota
- Kingdom: Animalia
- Phylum: Arthropoda
- Class: Insecta
- Order: Hemiptera
- Suborder: Heteroptera
- Family: Coreidae
- Genus: Leptoglossus
- Species: L. corculus

Binomial name
- Leptoglossus corculus (Say, 1832)

= Leptoglossus corculus =

Species of true bug

Leptoglossus corculus, the leaf-footed pine seed bug, is a species of leaf-footed bug in the family Coreidae. It is found in North America.
