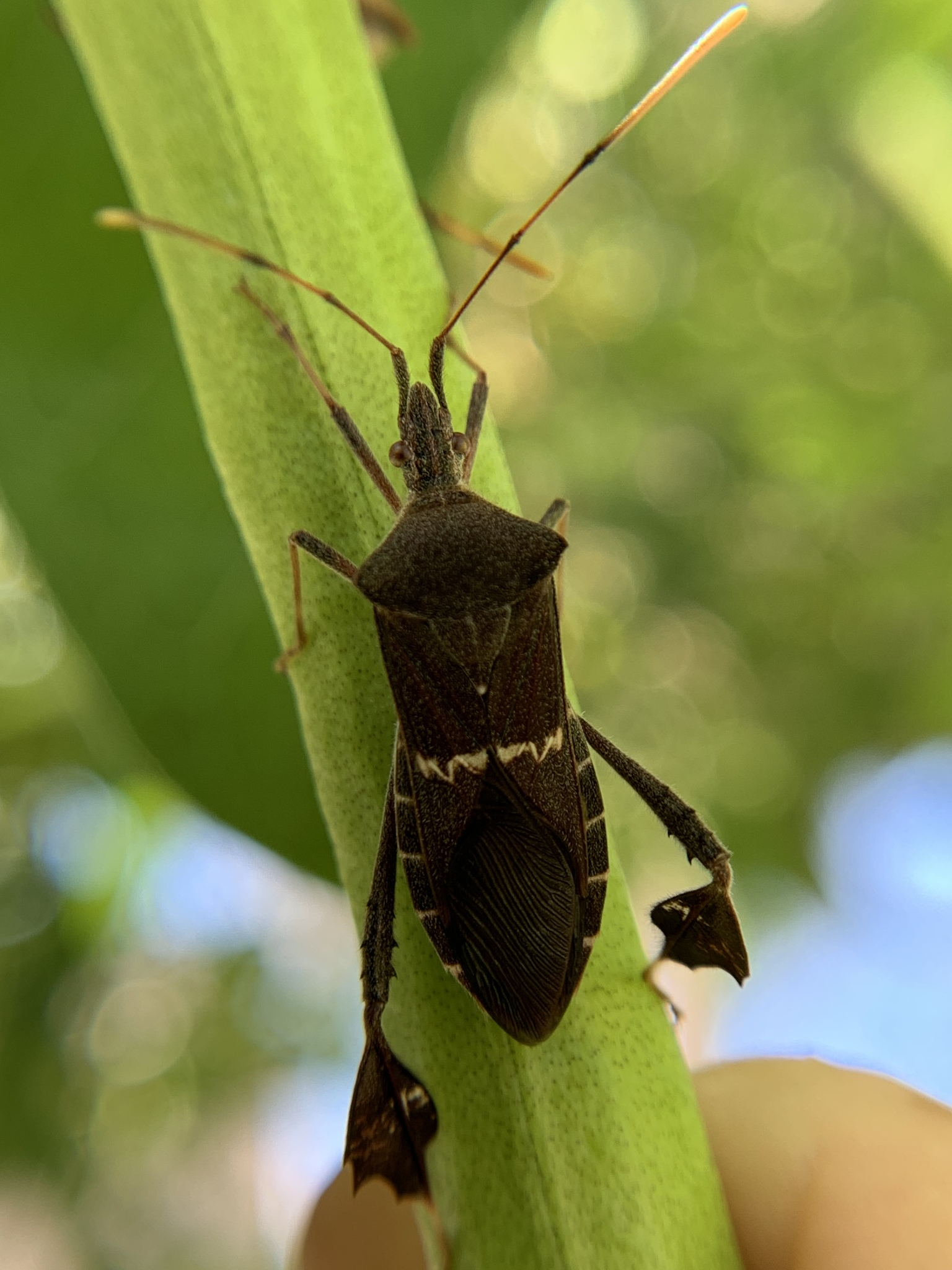

Scientific classification
- Kingdom: Animalia
- Phylum: Arthropoda
- Class: Insecta
- Order: Hemiptera
- Suborder: Heteroptera
- Family: Coreidae
- Tribe: Anisoscelini
- Genus: Leptoglossus
- Species: L. concolor

Binomial name
- Leptoglossus concolor (Walker, 1871)

= Leptoglossus concolor =

Species of true bug

Leptoglossus concolor is a species of leaf-footed bug in the family Coreidae. It is found in the Caribbean Sea, Central America, North America, and South America.
