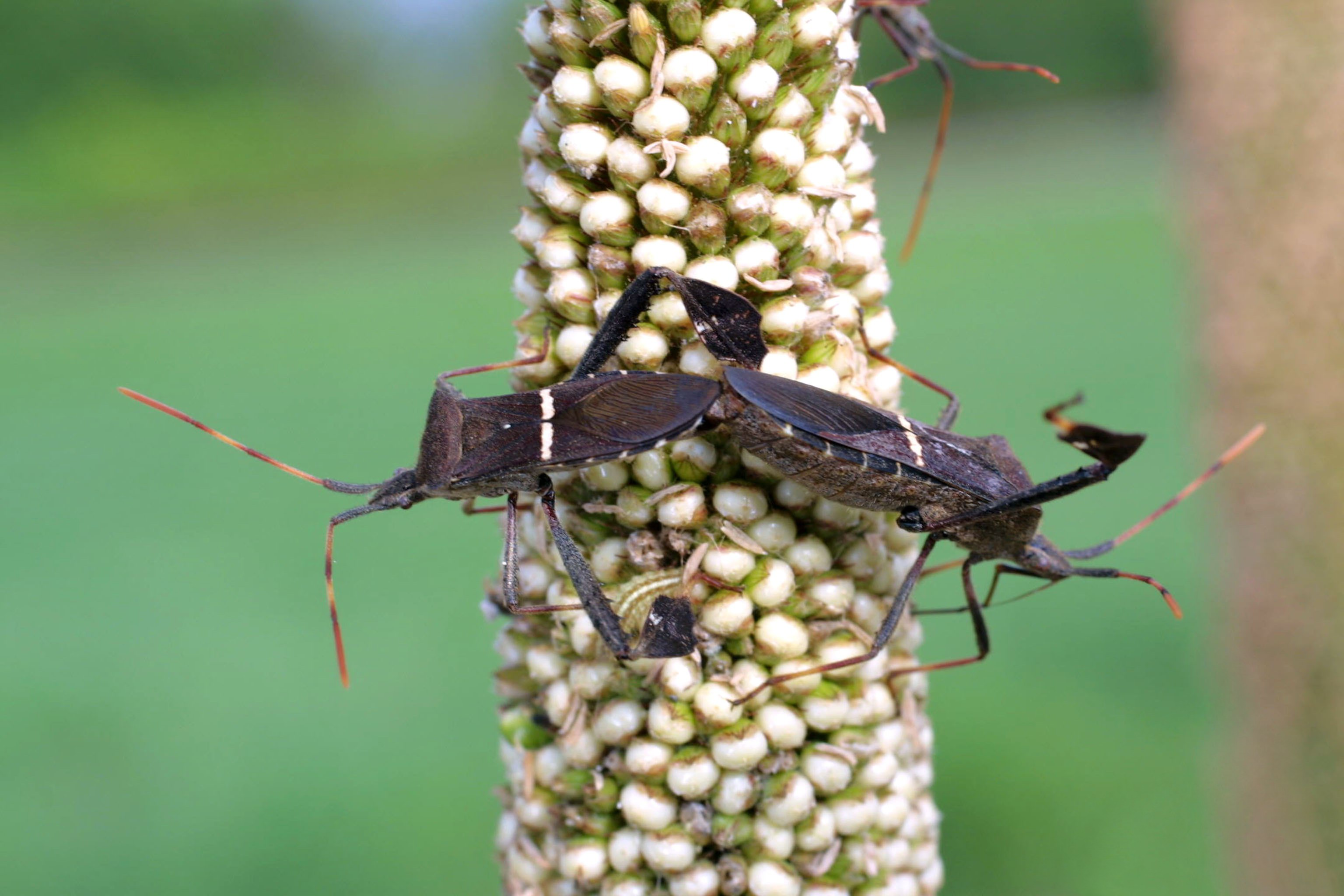
- Leptoglossus phyllopus on Pennisetum glaucum

Scientific classification
- Kingdom: Animalia
- Phylum: Arthropoda
- Class: Insecta
- Order: Hemiptera
- Suborder: Heteroptera
- Family: Coreidae
- Genus: Leptoglossus
- Species: L. phyllopus

Binomial name
- Leptoglossus phyllopus (Linnaeus, 1767)

= Leptoglossus phyllopus =

Species of true bug

Leptoglossus phyllopus or eastern leaf-footed bug is a species of leaf-footed bugs in the same genus as the western conifer seed bug (L. occidentalis). The eastern leaf-footed bug is found throughout the southern United States, from Florida to California, through Mexico, and as far south as Costa Rica.

These bugs are a common garden insect which may damage a wide variety of crops including cotton, peaches and tomatoes, and seeds such as beans, black-eyed peas and sorghum. Like other bugs L. phyllopus suck juices from plants by puncturing them with their sucking mouth parts, making them resistant to ingested pesticides. A toxin is injected into the plant when piercing its skin, causing discoloration and hard spots on fruits. The adult bugs are highly resistant to pesticides; however, they are vulnerable in their bright orange nymph stage. Trap crops can be used to lure them away from desired plants and to encourage predator populations, and in small garden plots handpicking, the use of trap crops, and bug traps baited with methyl (E, Z)-2,4-decadienoate can be effective controls.

Acetosyringone is produced by the male leaffooted bug and used in its communication system. Leptoglossus phyllopus emits a foul odor when it is handled

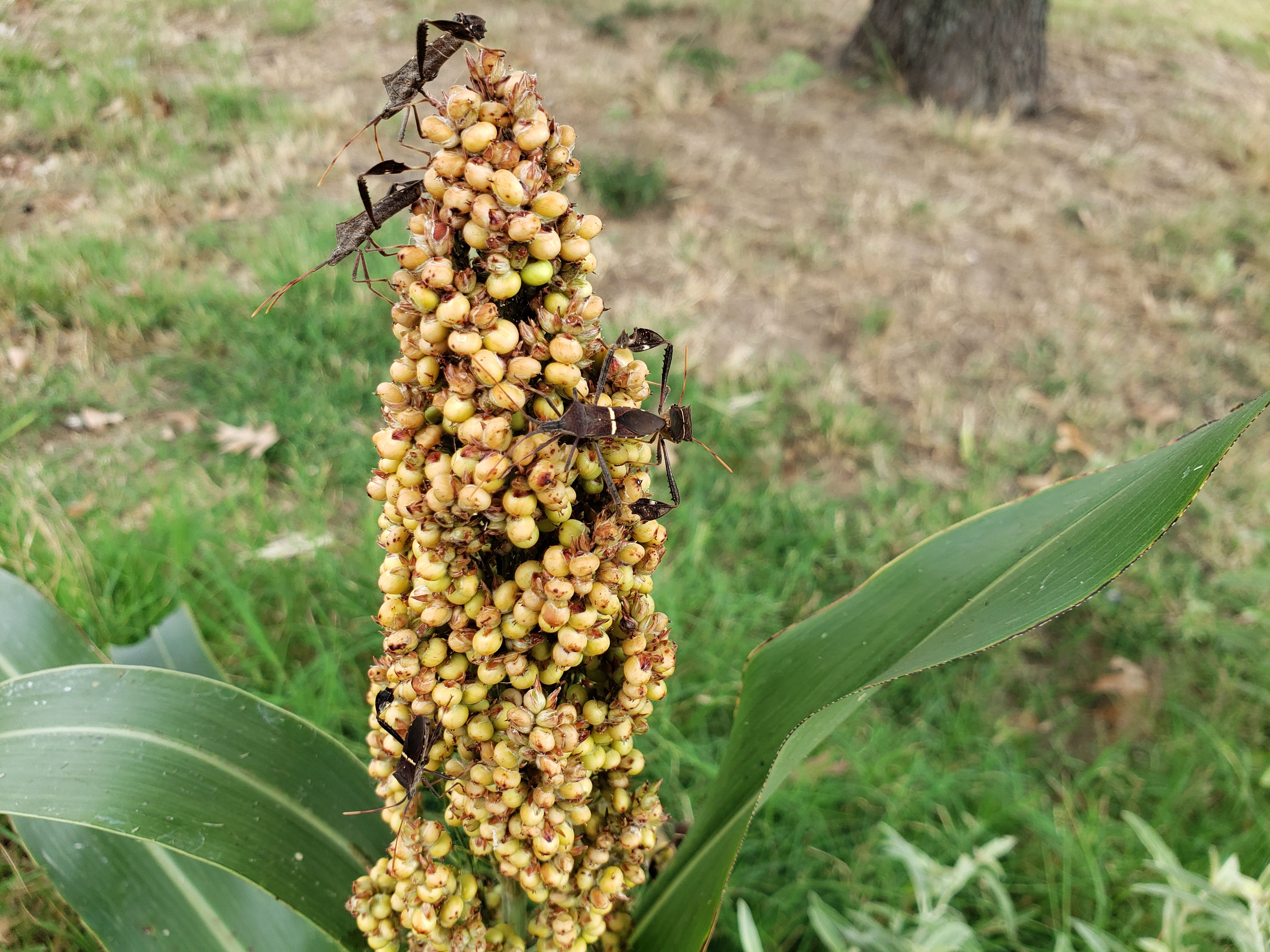
Leptoglossus on feeding milo in NE Texas, Fall 2019.

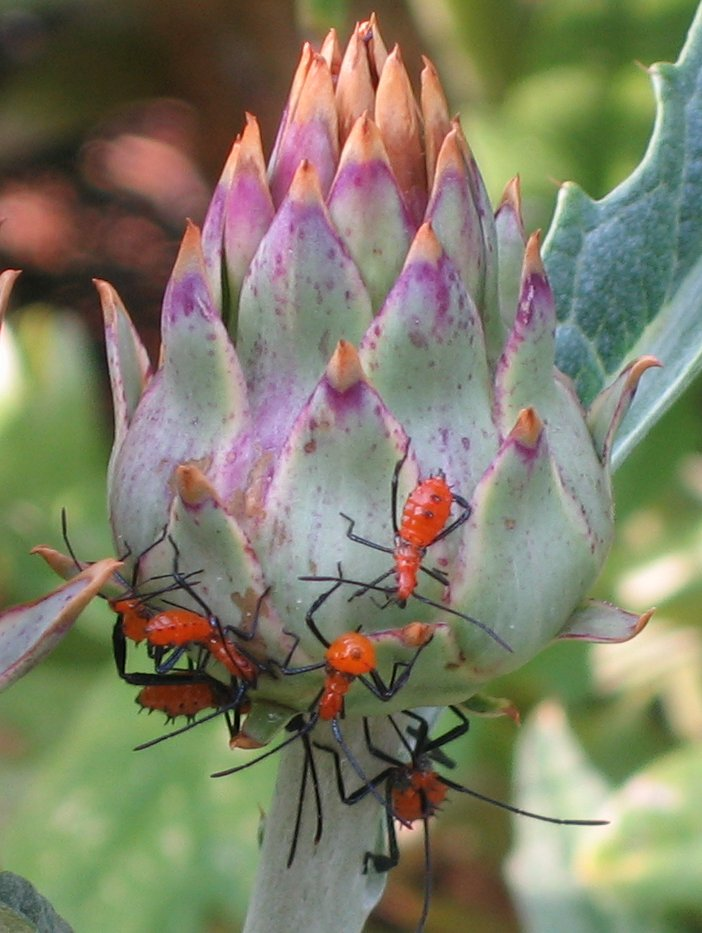
Nymphs on cardoon (Cynara cardunculus
