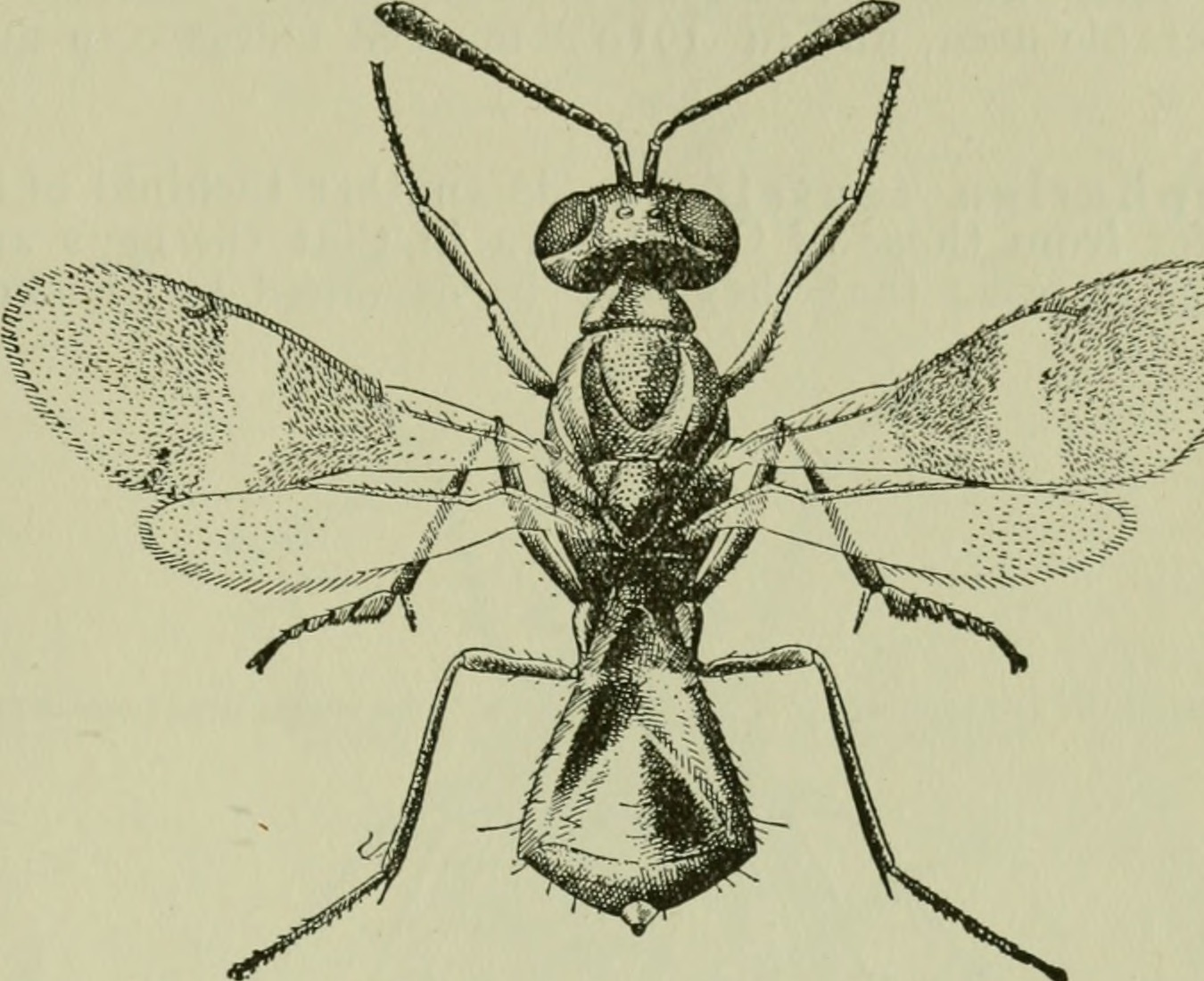

Scientific classification
- Kingdom: Animalia
- Phylum: Arthropoda
- Class: Insecta
- Order: Hymenoptera
- Family: Eupelmidae
- Genus: Anastatus
- Species: A. bifasciatus

Binomial name
- Anastatus bifasciatus (Geoffroy, 1785)

Synonyms
- Anastatus eurycephalus Masi, 1919; Cerycium pratense Erdös, 1946; Cinips bifasciata Fonscolombe, 1832; Cinips bombycum Fonscolombe, 1832; Cynips bifasciatus Geoffroy, 1785; Diplolepis bifasciata (Geoffroy, 1785); Diplolepis bombycum (Fonscolombe, 1832); Eupelmus bifasciatus (Fonscolombe, 1832); Eupelmus subaeneus De Stefani, 1898; Misocoris oomyzus (Rondani, 1872); Misocoris oophagus Rondani, 1877; Misocoris ovivorus Rondani, 1872; Pteromalus bifasciatus (Fonscolombe, 1832); Pteromalus gemmarum Fonscolombe, 1832; Pteromalus oomyzus Rondani, 1872; Pteromalus ovivorus Rondani, 1872

= Anastatus bifasciatus =

Species of parasitoid wasp

Anastatus bifasciatus is a species of parasitoid wasp in the family Eupelmidae. It is native to Europe, and has been harnessed for augmentative biological control against the brown marmorated stink bug, Halyomorpha halys. The study by Haye et al., 2015 especially demonstrates its effectiveness against the European BMSB invasion. It has also been considered as a biological control agent against spongy moth (Lymantria dispar) eggs in North America.

A. bifasciatus is a widespread generalist egg parasitoid of various arthropods, especially lepidoptera and hemiptera.

Females live for up to two months, while the males, which are smaller, only have adult lives of a few days. Females feed on nectar and honeydew.
