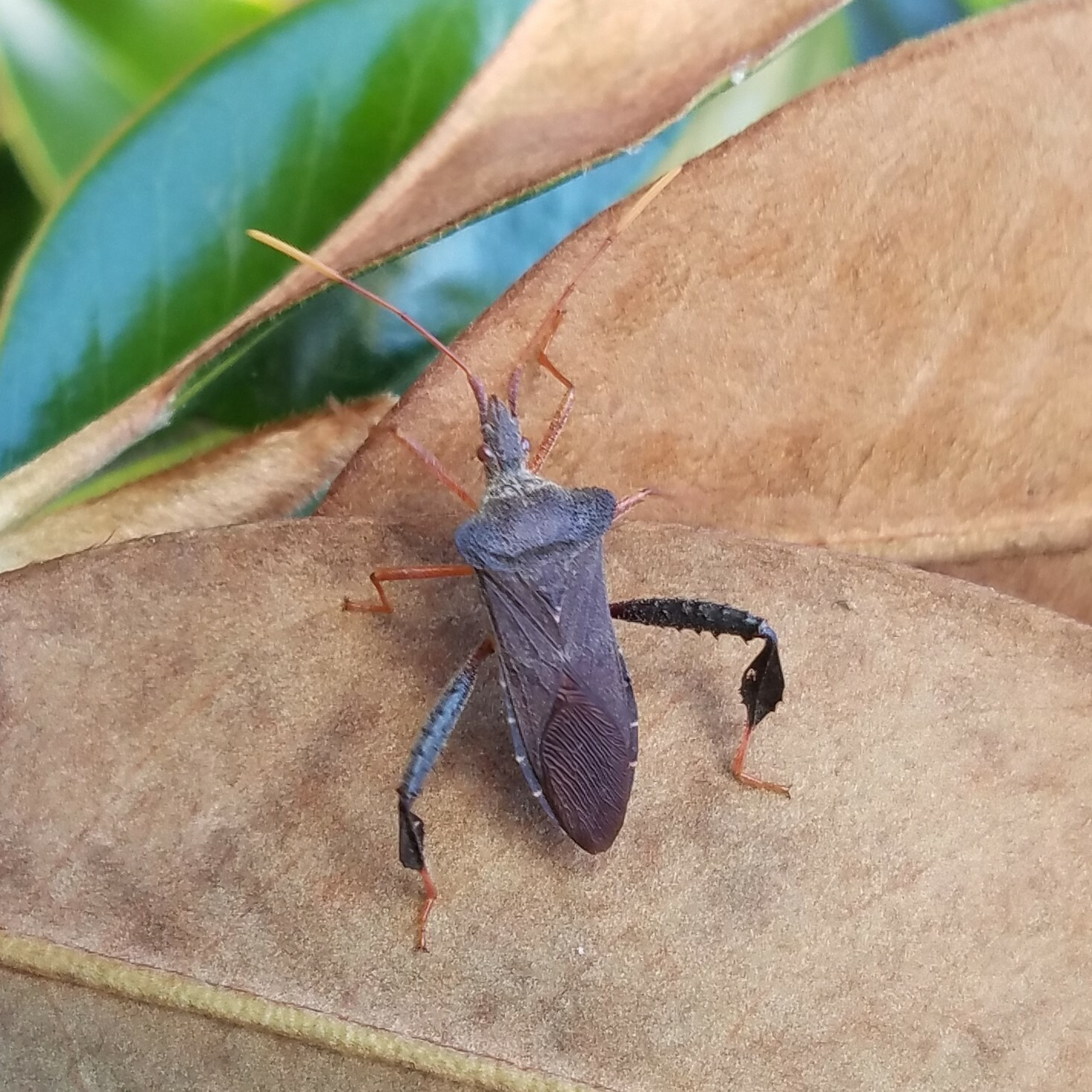

Scientific classification
- Kingdom: Animalia
- Phylum: Arthropoda
- Class: Insecta
- Order: Hemiptera
- Suborder: Heteroptera
- Family: Coreidae
- Genus: Leptoglossus
- Species: L. fulvicornis

Binomial name
- Leptoglossus fulvicornis (Westwood, 1842)

= Leptoglossus fulvicornis =

Species of true bug

Leptoglossus fulvicornis is a species of leaf-footed bug in the family Coreidae. It is found in North America.

The species is a specialist on magnolia fruit. Eggs are laid on the underside of leaves, and instars and adults feed on magnolia fruit and seeds.
