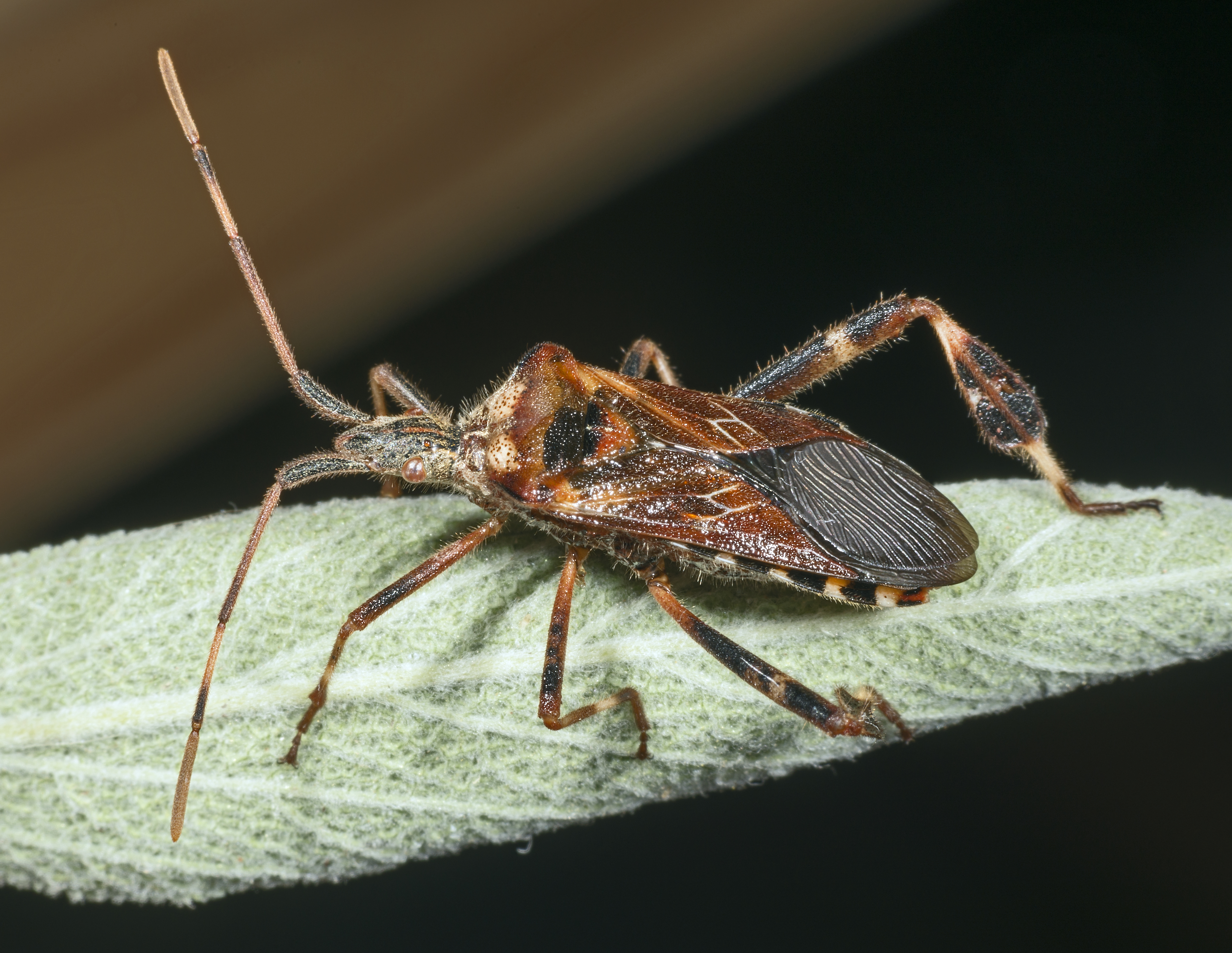

Scientific classification
- Kingdom: Animalia
- Phylum: Arthropoda
- Clade: Pancrustacea
- Class: Insecta
- Order: Hemiptera
- Suborder: Heteroptera
- Family: Coreidae
- Genus: Leptoglossus
- Species: L. occidentalis

Binomial name
- Leptoglossus occidentalis Heidemann, 1910

= Western conifer seed bug =

Species of true bug

Western conifer seed bug in Kanagawa, Japan

The western conifer seed bug (Leptoglossus occidentalis), sometimes called the pine-beetle, or abbreviated as WCSB, is a species of true bug (Hemiptera) in the family Coreidae. It is native to North America west of the Rocky Mountains (California to British Columbia, east to Idaho, Minnesota, and Nevada) but has in recent times expanded its range to eastern North America, to include Ontario, Québec, New Brunswick, Nova Scotia, Prince Edward Island, Michigan, Maine, Pennsylvania, New York, New Jersey, Connecticut, Massachusetts, Rhode Island, New Hampshire, Vermont, Ohio, Indiana, Kentucky, and Wisconsin, and has become an accidental introduced species in parts of Europe and Argentina.

This species is a member of the insect family Coreidae, or leaf-footed bugs, which also includes the similar Leptoglossus phyllopus and Acanthocephala femorata, both known as the "Florida leaf-footed bug". Western conifer seed bugs are sometimes colloquially called stink bugs. While they do use a foul-smelling spray as a defense, they are not classified in the stink bug family Pentatomidae. In Chile, it has been confused with kissing bugs (Triatominae), causing unjustified alarm.

== Description ==
The average length is 16–20 millimetres (0.63–0.79 in) with males being smaller than females. They are able to fly, making a buzzing noise when airborne. Western conifer seed bugs are somewhat similar in appearance to the wheel bug Arilus cristatus and other Reduviidae (assassin bugs). These, being Cimicomorpha, are not very closely related to leaf-footed bugs as Heteroptera go; though both have a proboscis that may look similar, only assassin bugs may use it to inflict a bite if it feels threatened, and L. occidentalis like its closest relatives can be most easily recognized by the expanded hindleg tibiae and by the alternating light and dark bands which run along the outer wing edges on the flaring sides of the abdomen.

Their primary defense is to emit an unpleasant-smelling alarm pheromone; however, if handled roughly they will stab with their proboscis, though they are hardly able to cause injury to humans as it is adapted only to suck plant sap and not, as in the assassin bugs, to inject venom.

The bug is sometimes called the Pine-beetle; however, the name is factually incorrect due to them not being beetles, but instead true bugs. The actual pine beetle is the species Dendroctonus ponderosae.

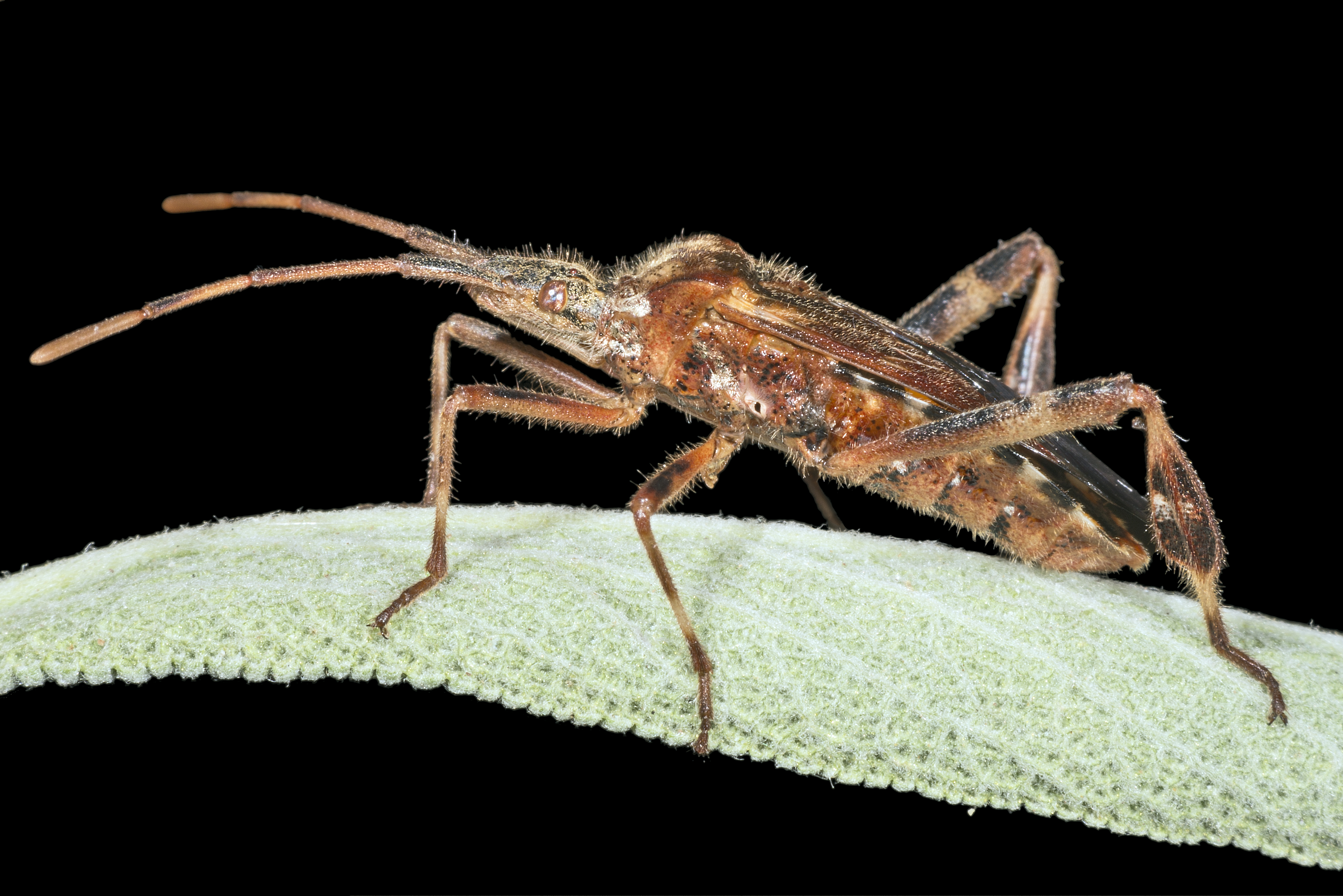
Profile

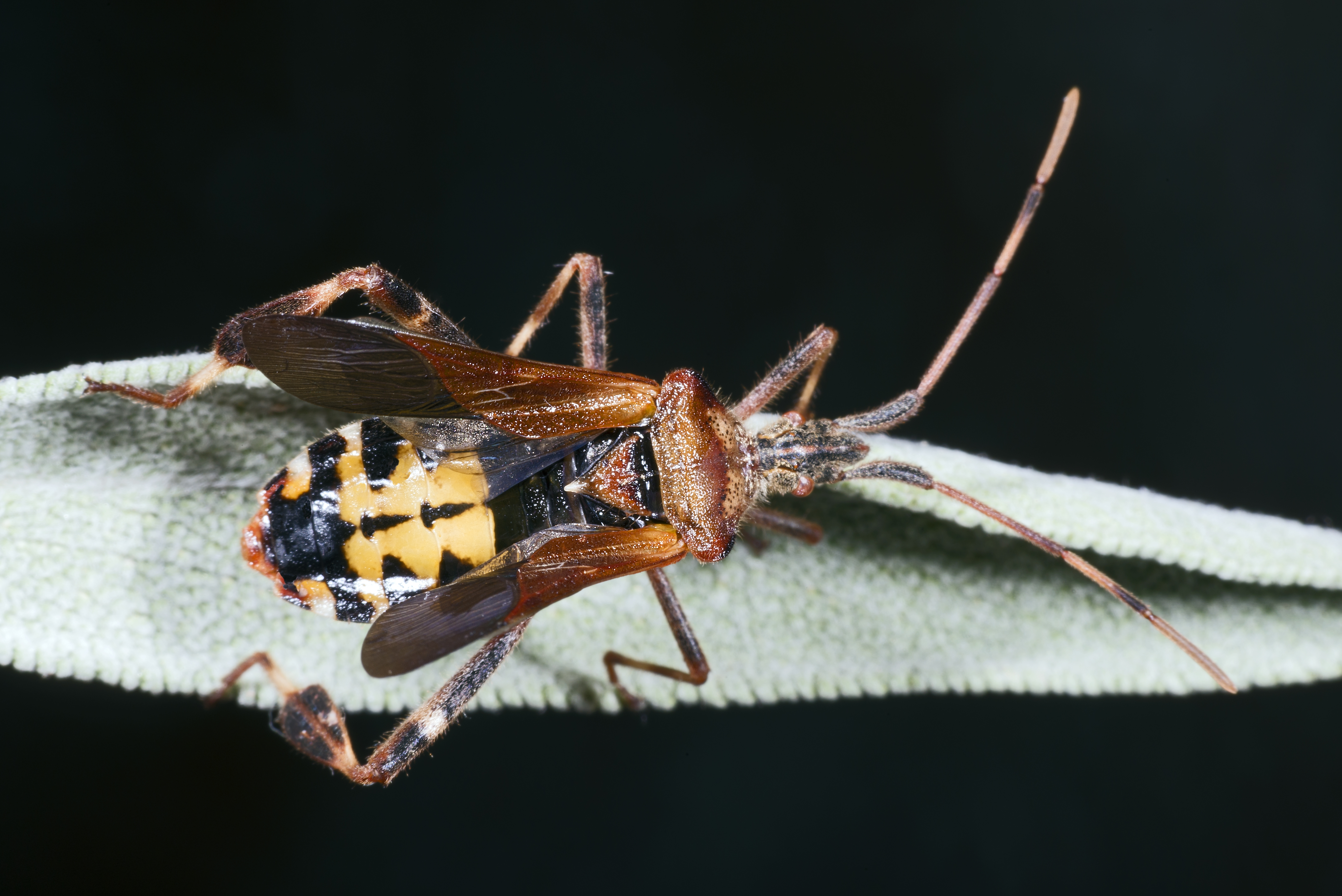
Abdomen

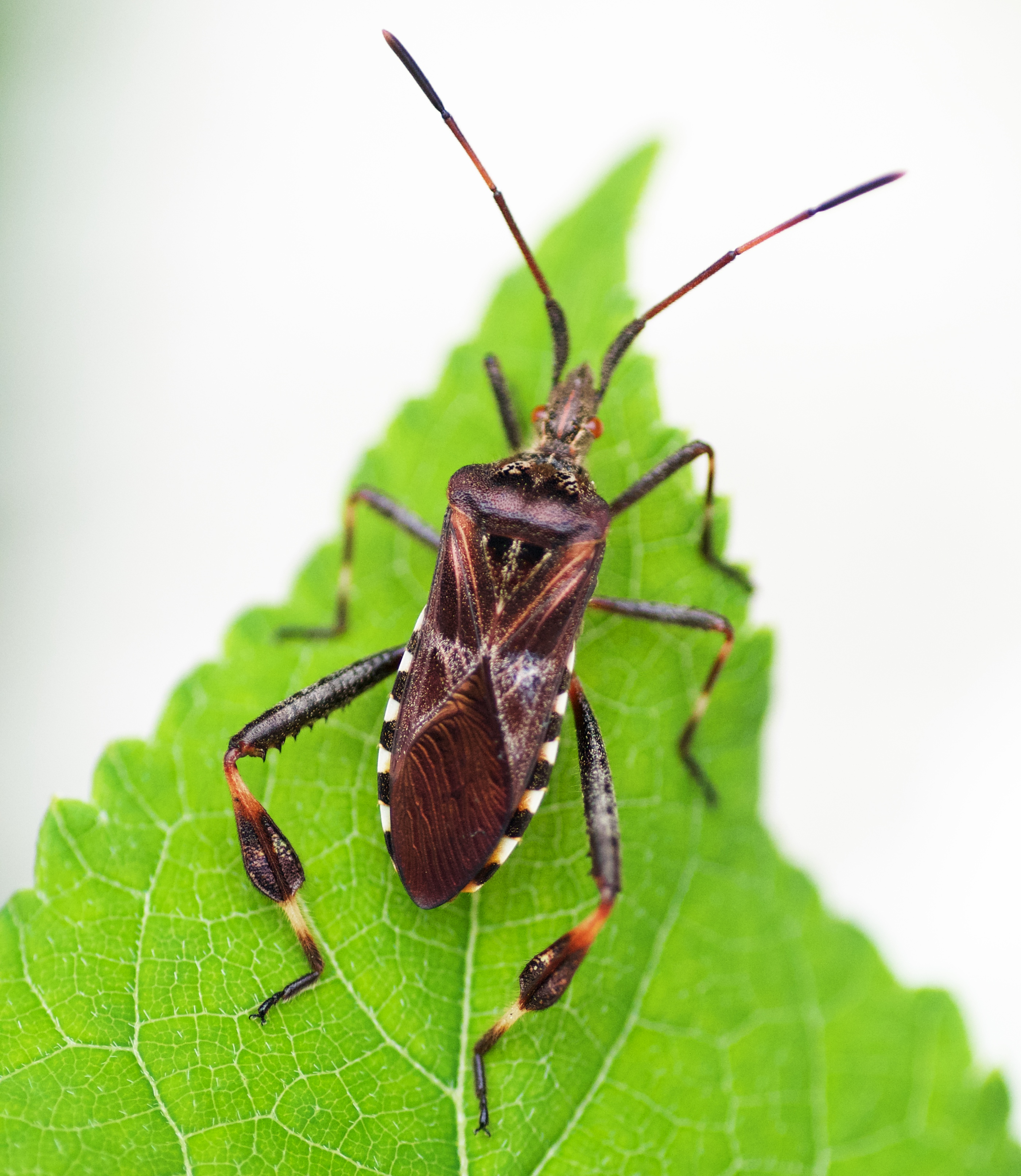
Back

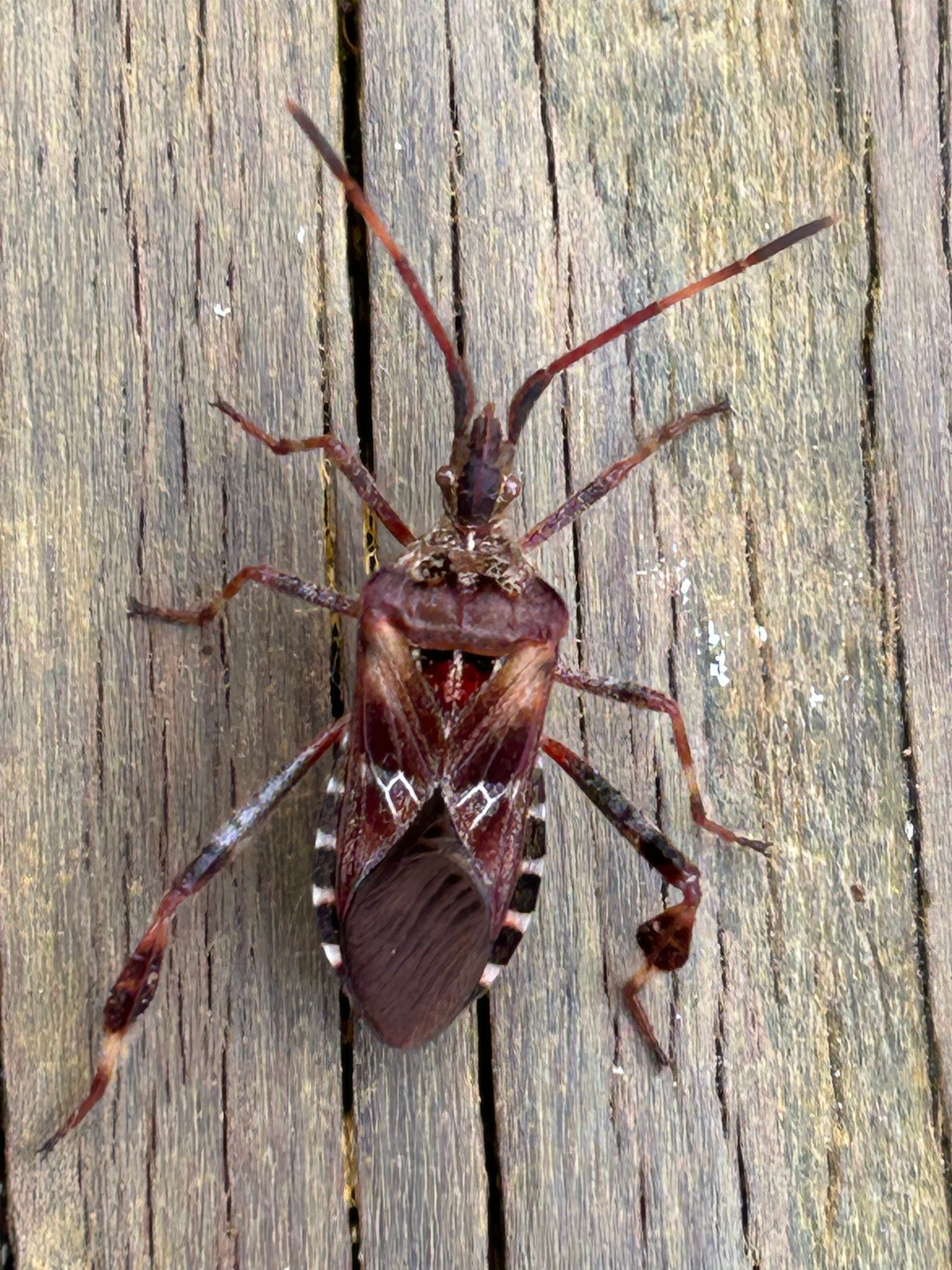
Back illustrating the zigzag pattern that is helpful in identification

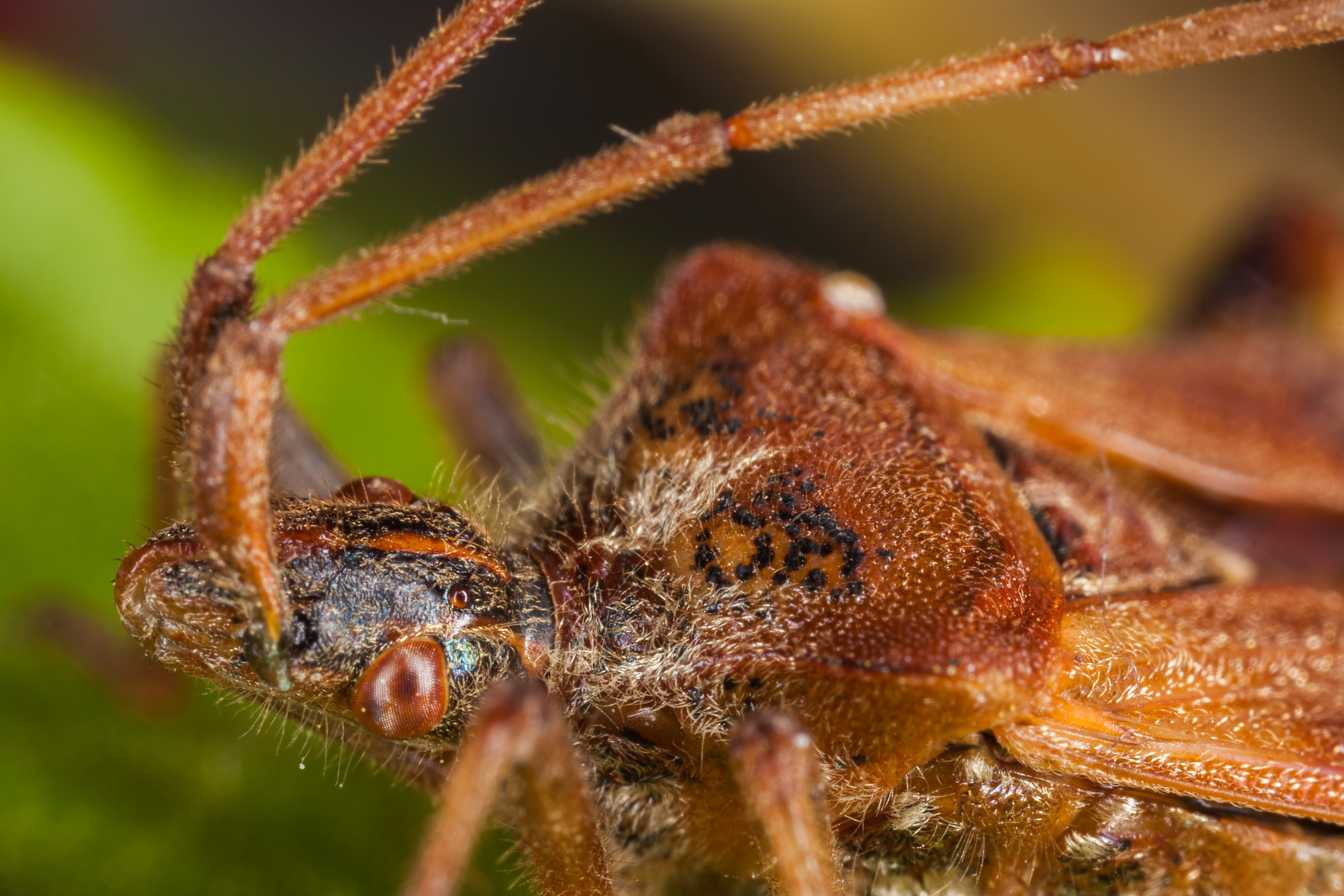
Detail of the head

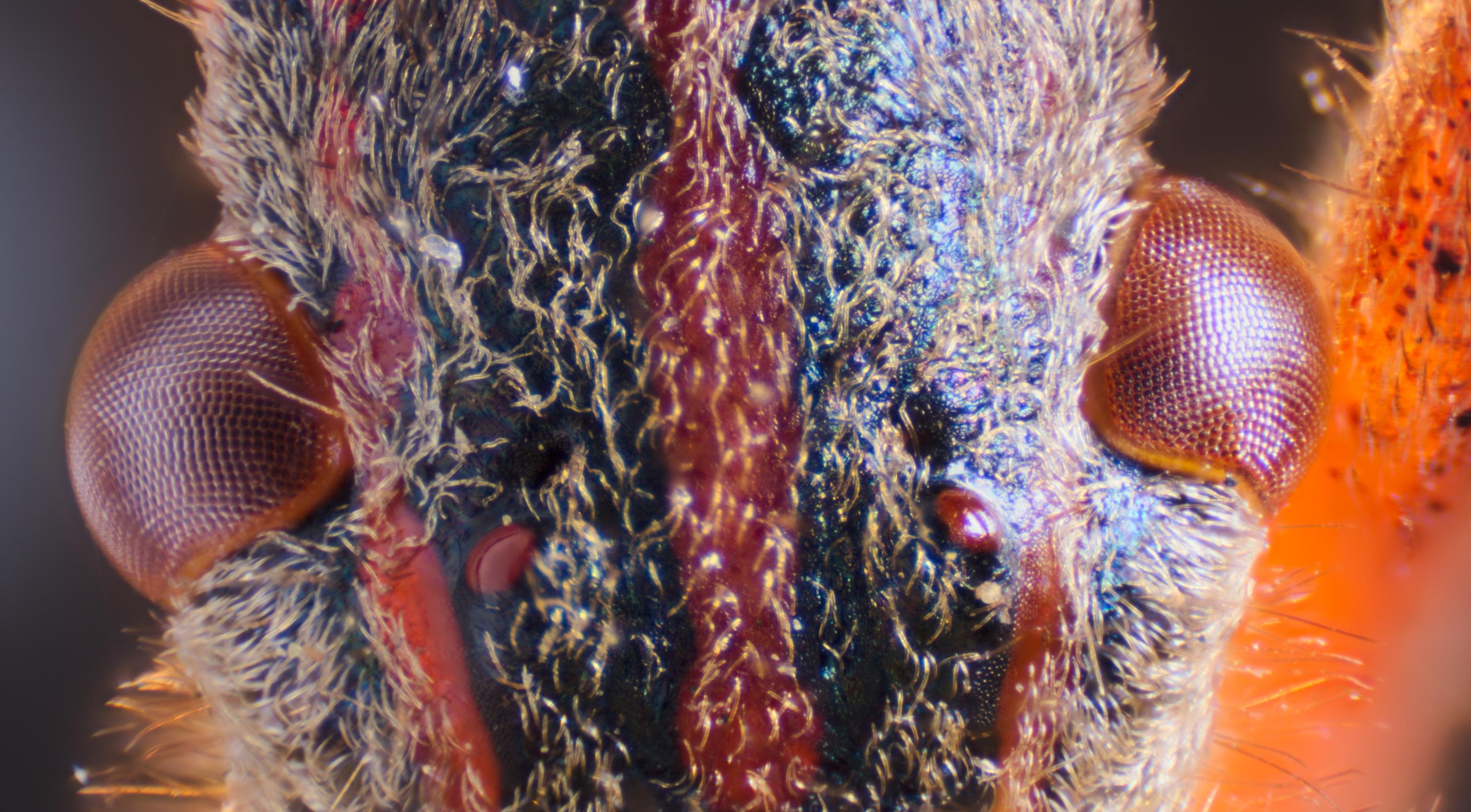
Macro photography of the eyes

== Ecology ==
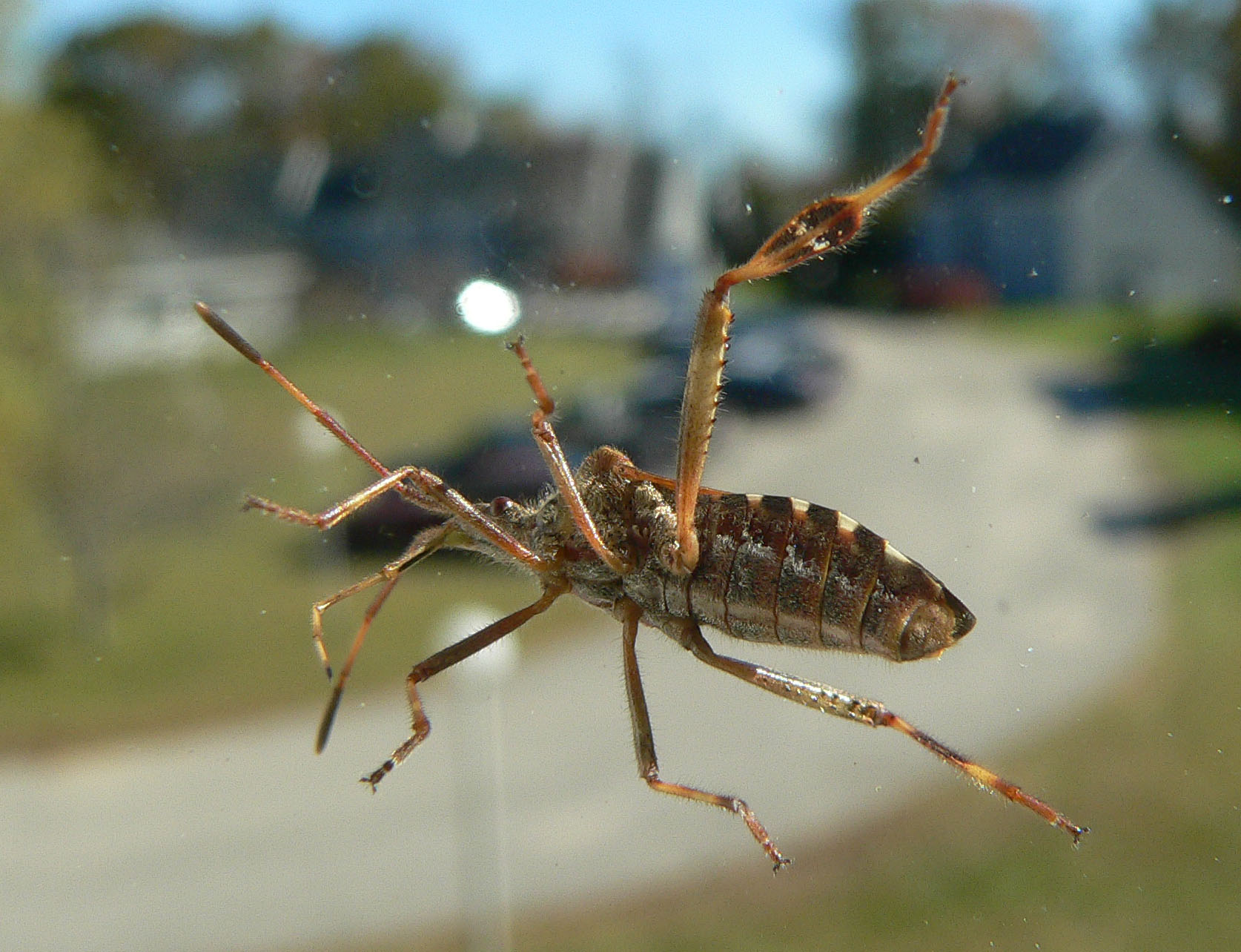
A WCSB found on a window in Maine in 2005

In its native range, the western conifer seed bug feeds on the sap of developing conifer cones throughout its life, and its sap-sucking causes the developing seeds to wither and misdevelop. It is therefore considered a minor tree pest in North America, but becoming sometimes more harmful e.g. in conifer plantations. However, it is not monophagous and even adaptable enough to feed on angiosperms if it has to, though it seems to prefer resiniferous plants that are rich in terpenes. As these are produced by plants to deter herbivores, it might be that in evolving its ability to overcome these defenses, L. occidentalis actually became somewhat dependent on such compounds.

Its host plants in the native range include conifers such as Douglas-fir (Pseudotsuga menziesii), ponderosa pine (Pinus ponderosa), lodgepole pine (Pinus contorta), and white spruce (Picea glauca). Outside the native range, it is found on species such as eastern white pine (P. strobus) and red pine (P. resinosa) in eastern North America and Europe, and mountain pine (P. mugo), black pine (P. nigra), Scots pine (P. sylvestris) and pistachio (Pistacia vera) in Europe.

The eggs are laid in small groups on the needles or leaf stems of its host plants, and hatch in spring. The nymphs go through 5 instar stages before moulting into adults. In the United States, the species is univoltine, but in southern Europe, it completes two generations a year, and in tropical Mexico even three. In the northern parts of its range, these bugs start to move about widely by September or so to seek crevices for overwintering; they may become a nuisance in areas with extensive conifer woods, as they will sometimes enter houses in considerable numbers. They have the potential to become structural pests, as it has been found that they will sometimes pierce PEX tubing with their mouthparts, resulting in leakage.

=== Range and invasiveness ===
This insect is common in its native range along the temperate and warmer regions of the Pacific coast of North America and has steadily expanded eastwards. On its native continent, L. occidentalis has been located as far northeast as Nova Scotia.

In Europe, this species was first reported in 1999 from northern Italy; it had probably been accidentally imported with timber and, as it seems, more than once, as its presence was subsequently reported from that country almost simultaneously from locations a considerable distance apart. By 2007, it had established itself in the northern Balkans (Slovenia, Bosnia and Herzegovina, and Croatia), the Alps (Austria, Switzerland), and parts of the Czech Republic, France, Germany and Hungary; in 2003, it was found to occur in Spain, though this population probably derives from a separate introduction. The 2007 records from Weymouth College (England) and Ostend (Belgium) might also represent one or two further independent introductions. In late 2007, it was found at Wrocław and Miechów (Poland); these animals probably represent a further range expansion out of the Czech Republic. During the autumn of 2008, a large influx of this species arrived on the south coast of England, indicating natural immigration from continental Europe. In late 2009, a large group of western conifer seed bugs invaded Koç University in Istanbul, Turkey. The same thing happened in October 2012 in most of the cities of the French Alps, like Moûtiers. In 2017 it appeared for the first time in the Southern Hemisphere, with several records from Chile.

It was also first recorded from Tokyo, Japan in 2008, and some additional records from Tokyo and Kanagawa Prefecture have been added until 2009.

In 2010 the first detection was made in Ukraine, in Dniprorudne, and the next year in Russia, in Rostov-on-Don.

In 2020 it was first reported in Finland.

On October 21, 2020, the first sighting in Andorra was posted to iNaturalist, and in September this species was found in Kozhukhovka in Ukraine.

It is present in North Macedonia.

On October 8, 2024, it observed in the mountains surrounding Sofia, Bulgaria, and again on October 20, 2024, in Velingrad, which is a town surrounded by coniferous forest.

In March 2025, it was observed in western Romania.

On September 29, 2025, it was observed in Klaipėda, Lithuania, near the port.
