= Hasan Bolkan =

American microbiologist

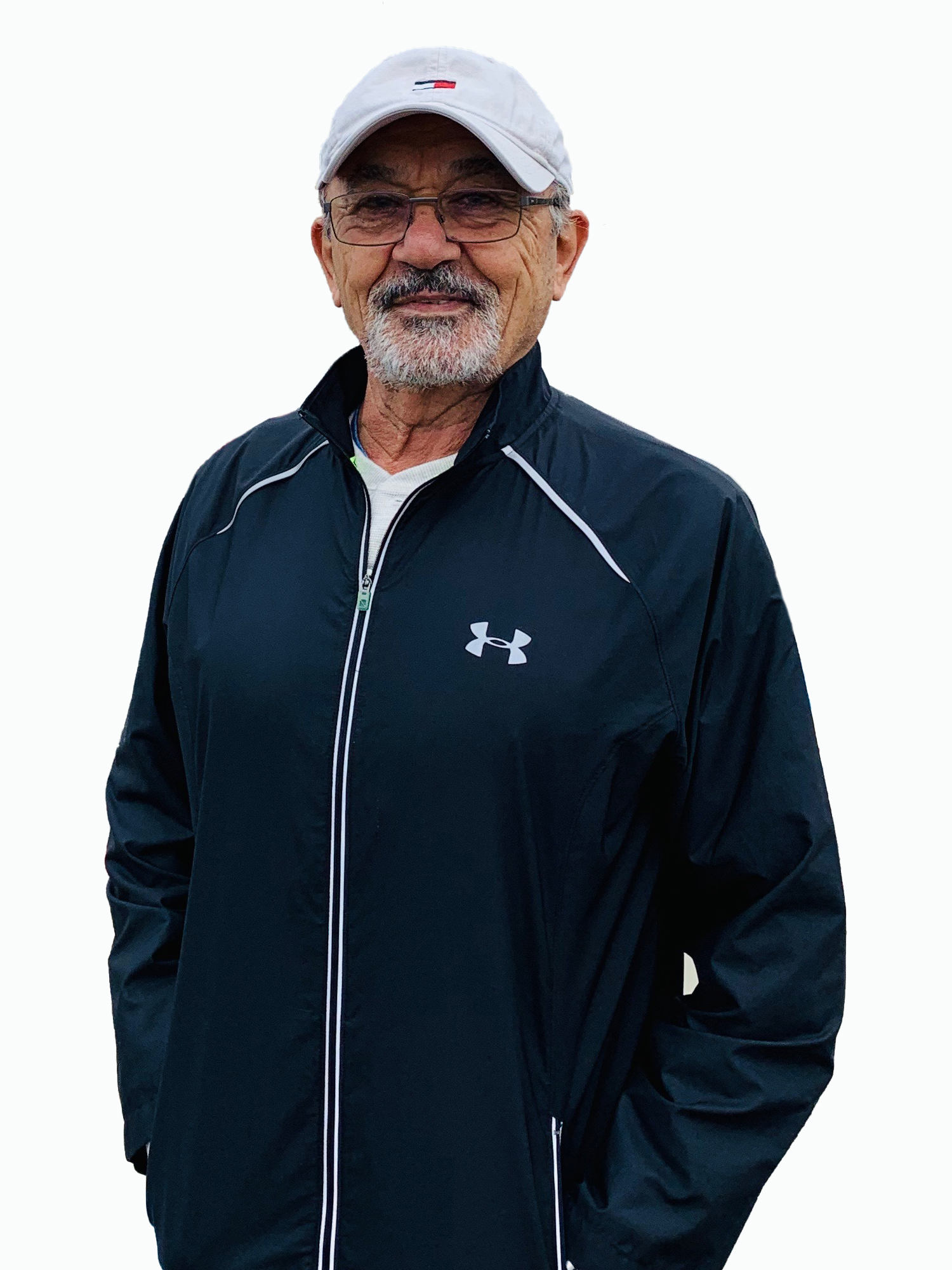
- Born: Republic of Cyprus
- Education: University of California, Davis (Ph.D., 1972)
- Occupation: Retired microbiologist
- Known for: Expertise of tomato crops

Hasan Bolkan is a retired research microbiologist who focused his career on plant pathology - diseases and infectious insects in tomato varieties and other produce. Bolkan retired from Campbell Soup Company as the director of research in the seed division. There he specialized in tomato production and disease control. He is known for his experience with commercial production of tomatoes.

== Career ==
His dissertation (1972) conducted at the University of California, Davis was entitled Studies on Heterokaryosis and Virulence of Rhizoctonia Solani. Bolkan is also credited with the discovery of the leaf-footed bug as a cause for lesions in pistachio crops in the 1980s. Bolkan has written about the importance of seed-testing for pathogens in commercial farming to reduce losses of crop and resources, authored a patent titled, Biocontrol agent for green mold disease of mushrooms, and has served as an associate editor for the Journal of Plant Disease (1996-1997). Bolkan has acted as a collaborating author on a publication of the Food and Agriculture Organization of the United Nations on sustainability and green farm production.

During his career he has consulted and presented to a number of international and national organizations such as OECD (reporting on pesticide usage in tomatoes via a case study in Mexico) and the Earth Negotiations Bulletin about pesticide residues. In his role as director of research for Campbell's agricultural research center, Bolkan has presented his work on integrated pest management and the need to address public and worker safety concerns, and has given talks on identifying and dealing with bacterial canker on tomato plants.
