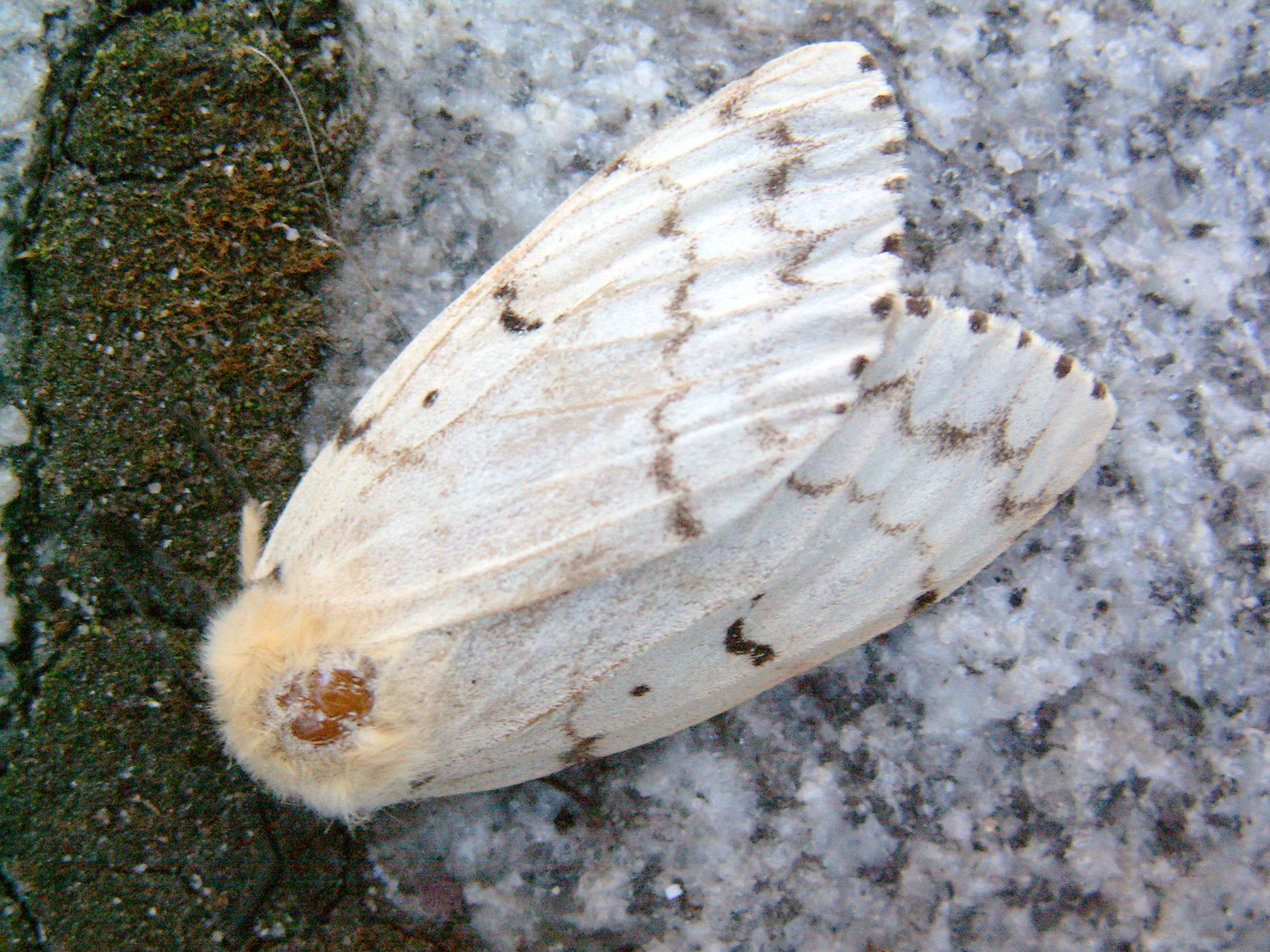
- Adult female
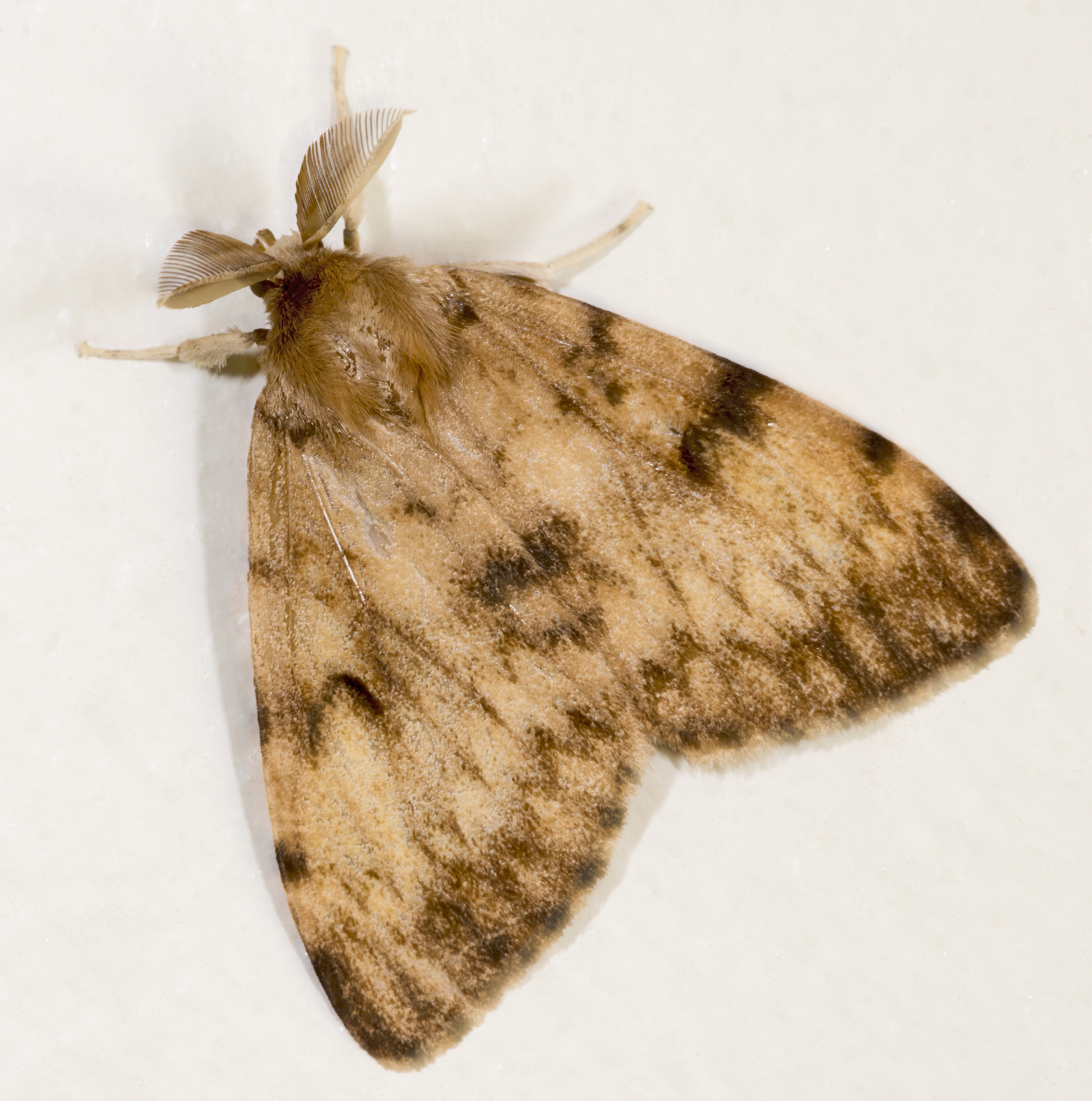
- Adult male

Scientific classification
- Kingdom: Animalia
- Phylum: Arthropoda
- Clade: Pancrustacea
- Class: Insecta
- Order: Lepidoptera
- Superfamily: Noctuoidea
- Family: Erebidae
- Genus: Lymantria
- Species: L. dispar
- Subspecies: L. d. dispar

Trinomial name
- Lymantria dispar dispar (Linnaeus, 1758)

= Lymantria dispar dispar =

Subspecies of moth (gypsy moth)

Lymantria dispar dispar, commonly known as the gypsy moth, European gypsy moth, or (in North America) North American gypsy moth or spongy moth, is a subspecies of the species Lymantria dispar in the family Erebidae. The subspecies has a native range that extends over Europe and parts of Africa, and is an invasive species in North America.

Its larvae are polyphagous, consuming the leaves of over 500 species of trees, shrubs and plants. In its invasive range it is classified as a pest, notably one of the most destructive pests of hardwood trees in the Eastern United States. It is listed as one of the 100 most destructive invasive species worldwide.

== Taxonomy ==
Carl Linnaeus first described the species as Phalaena [Bombyx] dispar in 1758. The subject of classification has changed throughout the years, resulting in confusion surrounding the species' taxonomy. This caused many references to describe this one species in different ways. The family has jumped between Lymantriidae, Noctuidae and Erebidae. L. d. dispar is designated the nominate subspecies of L. dispar.

The species L. dispar has been split into several subspecies, including L. d. subsp. asiatica and L. d. subsp. japonica. The family is Erebidae, subfamily Lymantriinae. Lymantriid larvae are commonly called tussock moths because of the tufts of hair on the larvae.

=== Etymology ===
The name Lymantria dispar is composed of two Latin-derived words. Lymantria means "destroyer". The word dispar is derived from the Latin for "unequal" and it depicts the differing characteristics between the sexes.

=== L. d. dispar versus L. dispar usage ===
For the purposes of taxonomy, the common names European gypsy moth and North American gypsy moth represent the same subspecies, L. d. dispar, as opposed to subspecies of L. dispar from Asia.

Confusion over the species and subspecies is widespread. For regulatory purposes, the U. S. Department of Agriculture has defined Asian Gypsy Moth as "any biotype of Lymantria dispar (sensu lato) possessing female flight capability". despite Lymantria dispar asiatica not being the only classified subspecies that is capable of flight; even females of L. d. dispar can fly, if only very weakly. Traditionally, all L. dispar have been referred to as gypsy moth, including when referring to Japanese, Indian, and Asiatic subspecies.

== Common name ==
In the species' native area, the English common name is "gypsy moth". In June 2021 the 17-member governing board of the Entomological Society of America decided to remove the name "gypsy moth" from the Society's Common Names of Insects and Related Organisms List as "hurtful to the Romani people", since gypsy is considered an ethnic slur by some Romani people especially in the United States where the moth is widespread. This led the Society to select a replacement name through a consultative process. In January 2022, the Society proposed the name spongy moth, in reference to the spongy mass of the egg casing. A 16-member governing board voted to approve the new name in March 2022.

== Range ==
L. d. dispar is indigenous to Europe. In southeastern England, it was widespread in the 19th century, but became extinct except for occasional migrants soon after 1900. It then recolonised naturally from the 1990s; colonies were found in London from 1995 and Buckinghamshire from 2005, and more widely since.

=== Introduction to North America ===
Compiled from county data by US Forest Service

Lymantria dispar dispar was first brought to North America in 1869 and rapidly became an invasive species. Étienne Léopold Trouvelot imported the moths with the intent of interbreeding them with silk moths in order to establish a new silkworm industry in the West. The moths were accidentally released from his residence in Medford, Massachusetts. There are conflicting reports on the resulting actions. One states that despite issuing oral and written warnings of possible consequences, no officials were willing to assist in searching out and destroying the moths. The other notes that Trouvelot was, in fact, well aware of the risk and there is no direct evidence that he contacted any government officials about the moths' release. Though the Asiatic and the Eurasian moths were not classified as different subspecies in the 1980s, the differences were already notable.

As noted in The Gypsy Moth (1896) by Forbush and Fernald, the moth was considered a nuisance just ten years after their release. The first major outbreak occurred in 1889, and Forbush and Fernald recount the extent of devastation: all the trees being defoliated and caterpillars covering houses and sidewalks and raining down upon residents. At first it was uncertain what species was responsible for the outbreak, but after the caterpillar was identified by entomologist Maria Elizabeth Fernald, an eradication program began in 1890. Eventually they would reach the Pacific Northwest, sporadically invading but so far not becoming established there, due to successful eradication campaigns.

==== Spread ====
The small larvae of the moth take to the air and are carried by the wind. The larvae spin silken threads and hang from them, waiting for the wind to blow. The light larvae have long hairs that increase their surface area, which are suitable for being carried aloft. The natural spread is slow, but transportation of the moth has led to isolated populations, with accidental transport of the eggs being noted. According to the United States Department of Agriculture, without intervention, this pest spreads about 13 miles (21 km) per year. A study published in 2012 suggests that storms can accelerate the spread, hypothesizing that strong easterly winds carried larvae across Lake Michigan to Wisconsin, a distance of at least 50 miles (80 km).

In June 2024, Scientific American reported the severity of the outbreak in the northeastern and midwestern regions of the United States. Some places in these regions were experiencing one of the most severe outbreaks ever recorded. Some areas reported densities exceeding 2,500,000 caterpillars per hectare (1,000,000 per acre). Some regions have grappled with this issue for five consecutive years.

Firewood transport is a common way for the eggs to spread, since the moths will lay their eggs on dead wood. Attempts have been made to limit the movement of firewood to reduce the moth's spread.

== Life cycle ==
=== Eggs ===
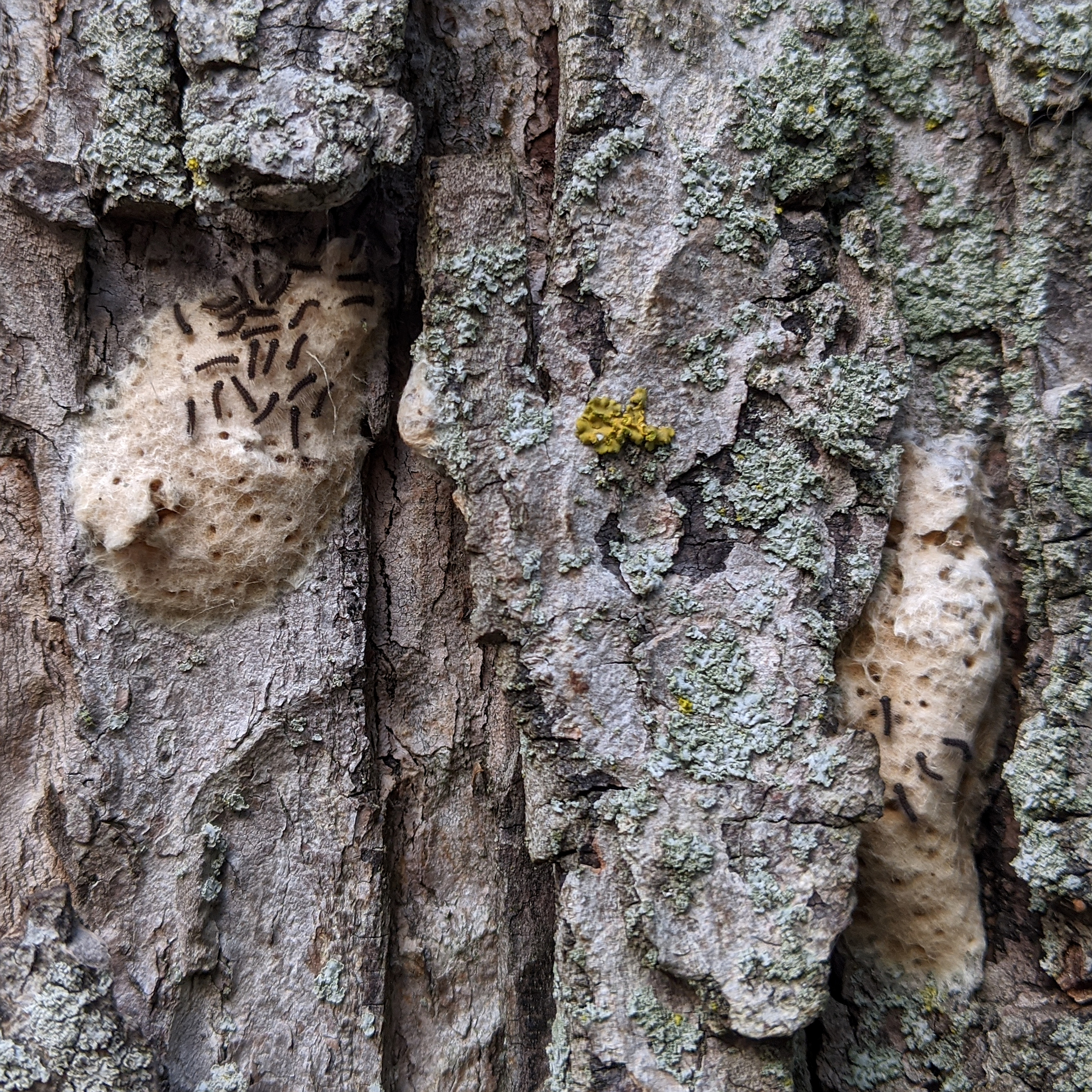
L. d. dispar larvae emerging from egg masses (Guelph, Ontario, May 2020).

Egg masses are typically laid on branches and trunks of trees, but may be found in any sheltered location, including rocks, foliage and vehicles. Females are flightless, so they lay eggs on a surface near where they emerged from their pupa. The eggs are covered in a coating of hairs. The covering provides protection from predators and parasites, and may be important for insulating the eggs from cold and for sealing in moisture.

The larva inside the egg becomes fully developed in about one month after being laid and then enters diapause to overwinter. The egg is in the overwintering stage lasting for eight or nine months. Development ceases in preparation for the winter. After an acclimation stage, during which the larva inside the egg reduces its water content, eggs can withstand freezing temperatures. The larva inside the egg resumes activity in the spring, and reabsorbs water. The larva will then chew through the chorion of the egg and the protective hair of the egg cluster in the spring.

Egg clusters are usually an oval about 19 millimetres (3/4 in) wide and 38 millimetres (1 1/2 in) long. The egg masses are buff yellow-brown, likened to a manila folder, but may bleach out over the winter months. As the female lays them, she covers them with hair-like setae from her abdomen. Egg clusters contain from 100 to 1000 eggs. Due to the appearance of the eggs, several common names have emerged; the German Schwammspinner (literally "sponge spinner") and French la spongieuse refer to the spongy texture of the egg cluster.

=== Larvae ===
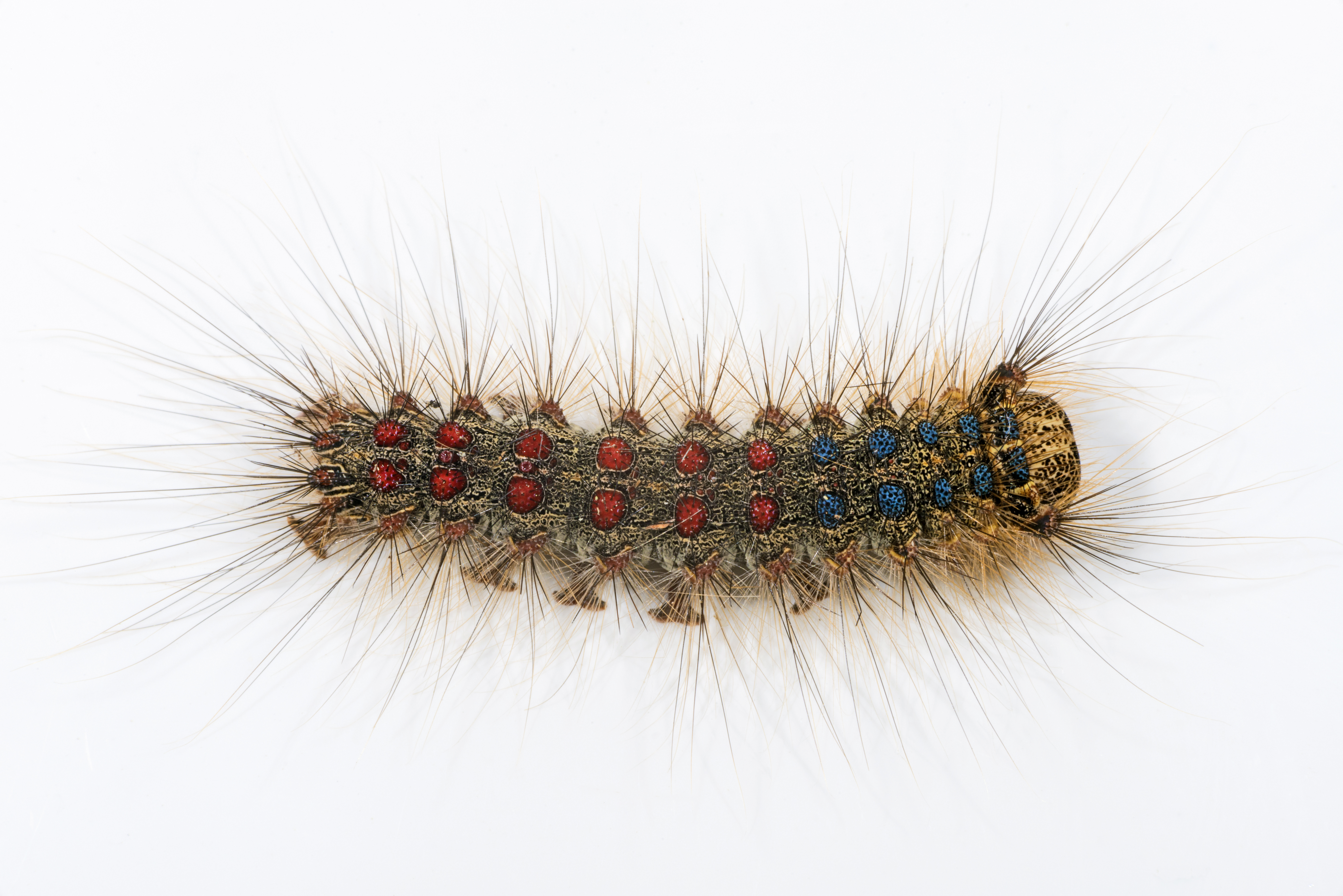
L. d. dispar caterpillar on paper

Larvae (caterpillars) emerge from egg masses in the spring. Most larvae hatch within a week, but can take as long as a month. The new larvae remain on or near the egg cluster if they hatch in rainy weather or if the temperature is below 7 °C (45 °F). The larvae will disperse even if there is enough foliage for growth, hanging from silk threads and waiting for the wind to send them aloft. The larvae are about 3 millimetres (1/8 in) long when they first hatch and will grow to 50 to 90 millimetres (2 to 3 1/2 in).

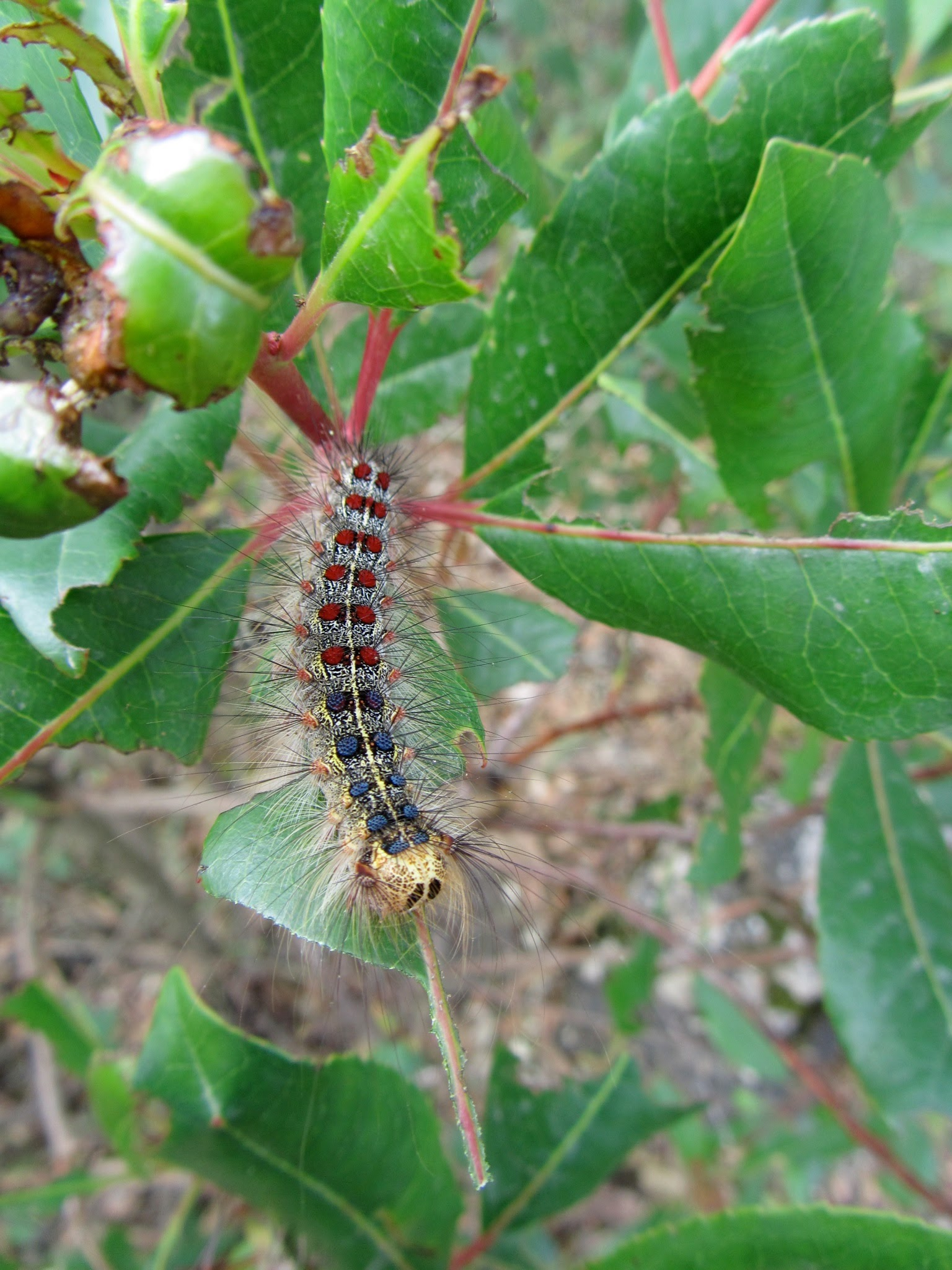
Eating leaves

The larva will first feed on the leaf hairs and then move onto the leaf epidermis. Feeding occurs in the daytime, primarily in the morning and late afternoon. As the larva grow, the feeding becomes a nocturnal activity. When not eating, the larva will remain on the underside of the leaf and make a mat of silk for attachment.

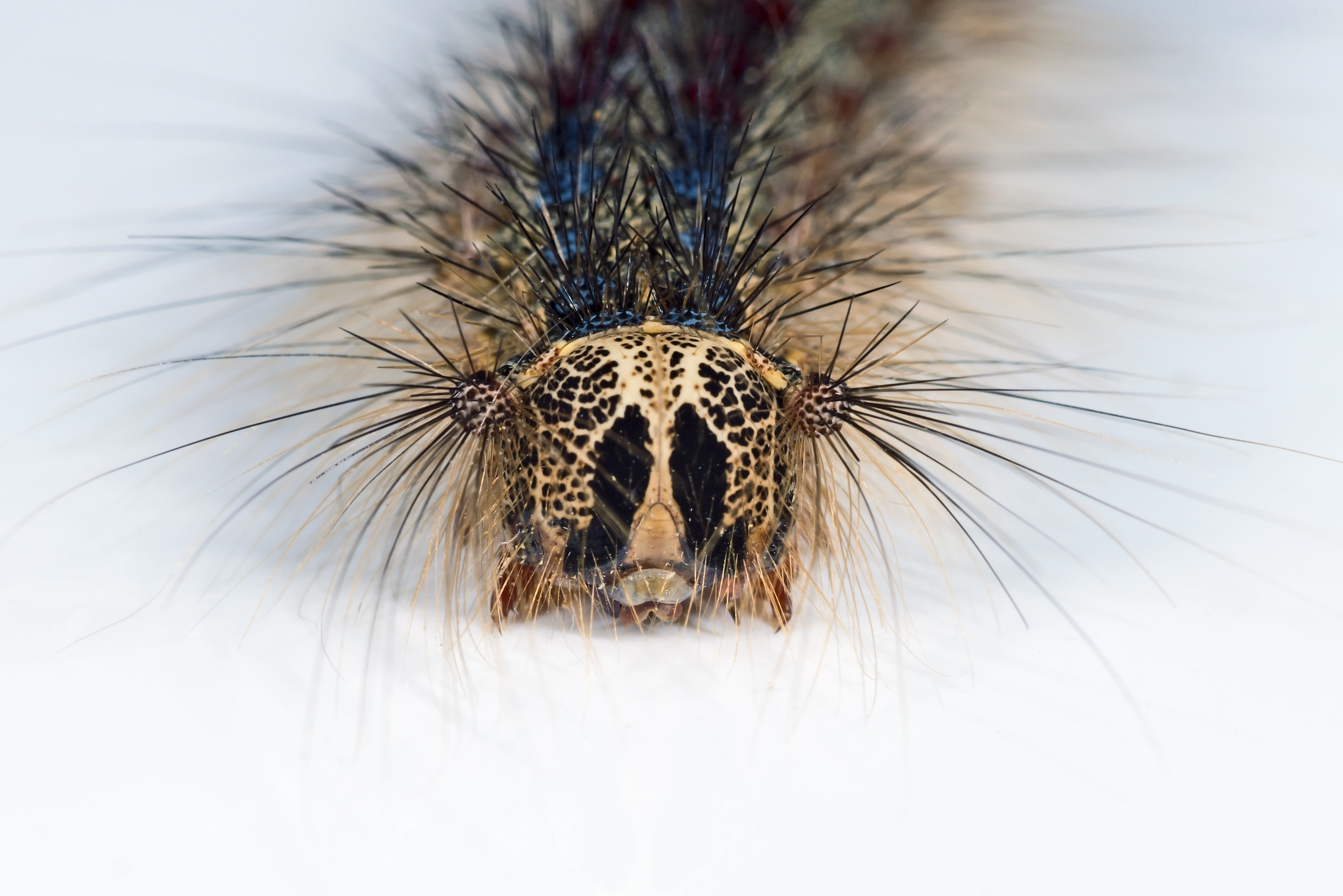
Caterpillar in frontal view

To grow, the larva must molt. Larvae are characterized by the term instar, which refers to the number of times a larva has molted; a first-instar larva has not yet molted, a second instar has molted once, a third instar twice, etc. Males typically are five instars and females are six instars. When the larvae reach the fourth instar, they become nocturnal feeders, and will return to their resting places at dawn, hiding under flaps of bark, in crevices, or under branches - any place that provides protection.

Newly hatched larvae are black with long, hair-like setae. Older larvae have five pairs of raised blue spots and six pairs of raised brick-red spots along their backs, and a sprinkling of setae. As the larval stage comes to an end they cease feeding and surround themselves in a silken net.

==== Distinguishing the larvae from other species ====
Larvae can be distinguished from other species of caterpillar by its spots. Close to the head, five pairs of blue spots and six pairs of red spots towards its tail. This distinction will prevent confusion with the spiny elm caterpillar and other caterpillars. Eastern tent caterpillars can be distinguished by their silky tents in trees, the presence of a back stripe, and their preference for cherry trees.

=== Pupae ===
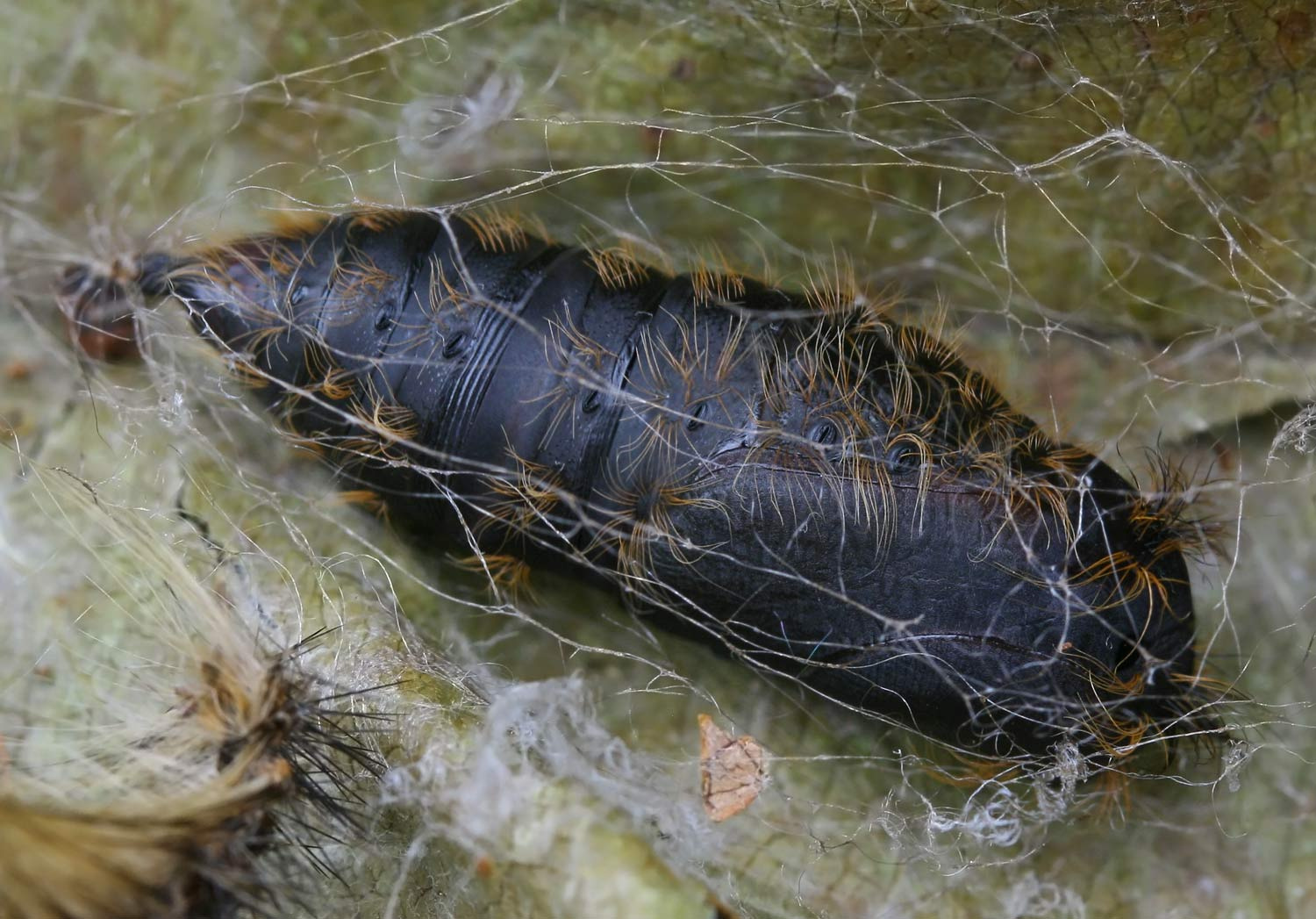
Pupa

The larvae reach maturity between mid-June and early July, then enter the pupal stage, during which larvae change into adult moths. Pupation lasts from 14–17 days. The adult moth will emerge, fully developed, by splitting the pupal skin.

When the population is spread out and running low, pupation can take place under flaps of bark, in crevices, under branches, on the ground, and in other places where larvae rested. During periods when population numbers are dense, pupation is not restricted to these locations, but can take place in sheltered and open locations, even exposed on the trunks of trees or on foliage of nonhost trees. Usually, the caterpillars create flimsy cocoons made of silk strands holding the leaf together, while others do not cover their pupae in cocoons, but rather hang from a twig or tree bark, like butterfly pupae do.

=== Adults ===
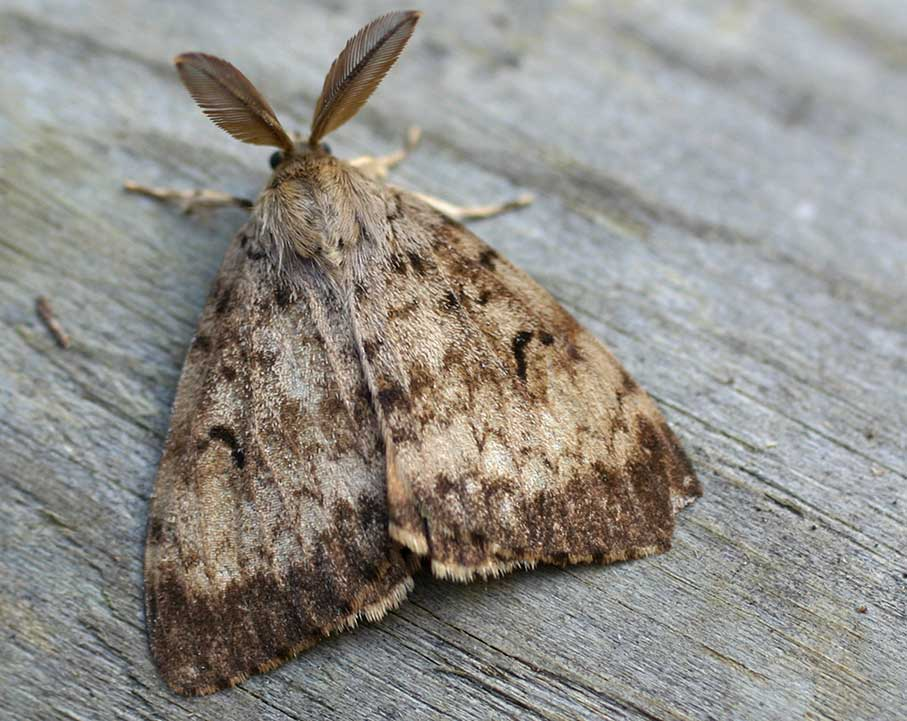
Adult male

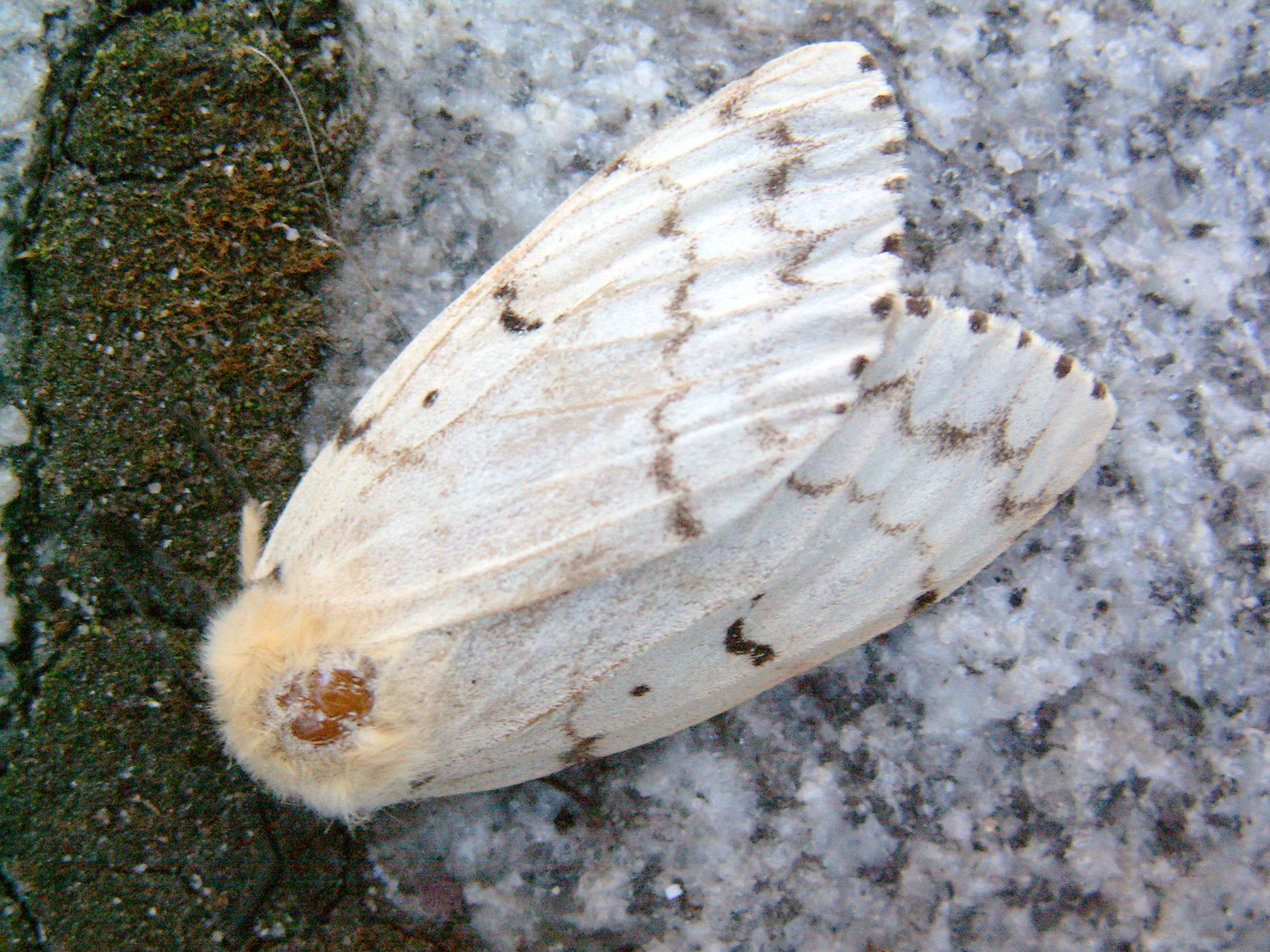
Adult female

Males have feathery antennae versus the thin antennae of females. Size differences are also noted, with the forewing of the male moth being 20–24 millimetres (13/16–15/16 in) long, and that of the female 31–35 millimetres (1 1/4–1 3/8 in). The females are bigger than the males. Another important difference between the sexes is that females possess fully formed wings but do not fly. Female flight is common in Eurasia, but these moths may be of a different species.

Moths usually emerge from pupae in July, but it can vary with population density and climate. The brown male gypsy moth emerges first, usually one or two days before the females do. The males fly in rapid zigzag patterns, but are capable of direct flight. Like most moths, the males are typically nocturnal, but can sometimes be seen flying during the day as well. The males fly up and down tree trunks, or other vertical objects in search of females. When heavy, black-and-white egg-laden females emerge, they emit a pheromone that attracts the males. The female has a small gland near the tip of the abdomen that releases the pheromone with a pumping motion, termed "calling". It can attract males from long distances, tracking the scent through its erratic flight pattern. The sex pheromone of female gypsy moths is (7R,8S)-7,8-epoxy-2-methyloctadecane. A previous failed identification of this pheromone, 10-acetoxy-cis-7-hexadec-1-ol, was given the trivial name of gyptol. It was found in female moth extracts, but was later shown to be inactive. The structure determination of this pheromone was an eventful chapter in the history of pheromone chemistry.

Courtship is not elaborate: the female must raise her wing to allow the male to couple with her. The moths remain in copula for up to an hour, but the transfer of the spermatophore is usually accomplished within 10 minutes. A male moth can inseminate more than one female. Multiple mating in females is possible but uncommon, as the female stops releasing the attracting pheromone after mating. After mating, the females begin depositing the eggs.

Adult moths live about one week. They do not possess an active digestive system and cannot feed, but they can drink in moisture. The reproductive chance for females lasts about two days, with the pheromone for attracting males being diminished by the third day. Due to the pheromone's potency, most females will mate.

Females lay their eggs on trees, shrubs, rocks, vehicles, and plants of many types. Each of them typically lays about 500 eggs. The eggs are covered with a peachy fuzz that can cause serious rashes if touched by bare skin or fur.

== Behavior ==
Many environmental factors such as resource availability, predator density and sexual competition are known to affect behavior from its larval stage to adult stage. A population will exist for many years in low densities. When the population enters the release phase, it rapidly expands to the outbreak phase where the population size will rise several orders of magnitude and fall back within only a few generations.

=== Feeding ===
The gypsy moth brings one of the largest impacts in defoliation of deciduous trees in the Northern Hemisphere. Since its introduction into the United States in 1868 or 1869, it has spread both west and south, now taking over most of the hardwood forests in the eastern United States and Canada. Over 300 species of trees and shrubs are hosts.

Larvae will climb up any object in their path in search of food.

==== Hosts ====
Larvae prefer oak trees, but may feed on many species of trees and shrubs, both hardwood and conifer. In the eastern US, the gypsy moth prefers leaves of oaks, aspen, apple, sweetgum, speckled alder, basswood, gray birch, paper birch, poplar, willow, and hawthorns, among other species. Older larvae feed on several species of softwood that younger larvae avoid, including cottonwood, hemlock, Atlantic white cypress, and pine and spruce species native to the east. The gypsy moth avoids ash trees, tulip-tree, American sycamore, butternut, black walnut, catalpa, flowering dogwood, balsam fir, arborvitae, American holly, and mountain laurel and rhododendron shrubs, but will feed on these in late instars when densities are extremely high.

=== Predation ===
Many species have been identified as preying on L. dispar. Some species, such as the white-footed mouse or Anastatus disparis, have a significant impact on the population dynamics of the moth. On the other hand, avian predation and invertebrate predation show only small effects on population dynamics.

==== Small mammals ====
The white-footed mouse (Peromyscus leucopus), is considered important for regulating sparse moth populations. Rodents consume larvae and pupae that seek resting sites near or on the ground. The white-footed mouse is the most common and widely distributed small mammal in the northeastern United States. The northern short-tailed shrew is common east of the Rocky Mountains and will consume the larva and pupa.

==== Birds ====
Insectivorous birds prey upon the larva of the gypsy moth, but the egg clusters are protected by their hair coverings. The effects of bird predation have not been fully studied in North America, but it has been well documented in Japan and Eurasia. When outbreaks of gypsy moths occur, bird predation has no significant effect on the population. Birds that consume gypsy moth larvae, pupae and adults include the blue jay, red-eyed vireo, eastern towhee, northern oriole, catbird and the European robin. The black-capped chickadee feeds on the moth throughout its entire life cycle, including the eggs.

Many bird species feed on gypsy moth larvae, but they are not a major food source for any common bird species. Although a few European studies cite avian predation as a large influence in keeping the gypsy moth population in control, few studies exist to prove this.

==== Invertebrate predation ====
Calosoma sycophanta is a beetle that preys upon the gypsy moth larvae and pupae. Larvae and adults of the species tear open their prey and feed upon them. In low density populations, there is a positive correlation between larval mortality and predation rates on pupae.

==== Parasites ====
Gypsy moth parasitoids have been widely studied, but they do not seem to have major effects on the population.

Four species of parasitic flies prey on gypsy moth larva. Parasetigana silvestris and Exorista larvarum lay an egg on the gypsy moth larva. If that egg hatches before the gypsy moth larva molts, the fly larva will penetrate the host. Compsilura concinnata pierces the gypsy moth larva and deposits its own larva inside. Blepharipa pratensis lays its eggs on leaves. The gypsy moth larva will consume the egg and the fly larva will hatch inside its gut.

Eight species of parasitic wasps attack the gypsy moth. Ooencyrtus kuvanae and Anastatus disparis attack the eggs. O. kuvanae attacks the eggs, but the effectiveness is limited by the ovipositor which can only penetrate the surface layer of the egg cluster. A. disparis has limited success as a predator because it can only attack unembroyonated eggs and the female wasps do not have wings. Even so, A. disparis is the only species that is known to occasionally affect the population dynamics of the gypsy moth. Apanteles melanoscelus and Phobocampe disparis parasitize the early larva stages. intermedia and Monodontomerus aureus parasitize the gypsy moth pupae.

A parasite native to North America, Itoplectes conquisitor, attacks and kills gypsy moth pupae, but development of the larva is rare within the host and the number of attacks themselves is also low.

Glyptapanteles portheriae and G. liparidis are both wasps that lay eggs on the gypsy moth larva. Study of G. liparidis showed almost 90% success when the host is parasitized during premolt to the third instar. Most invertebrate predation occurred when larvae were in the litter.

The population in Austria suffered high parasitism by the tachinids Parasetigena silvestris, which may have contributed in prevention of further increase in L. dispar in this locality.

==== Pathogens ====
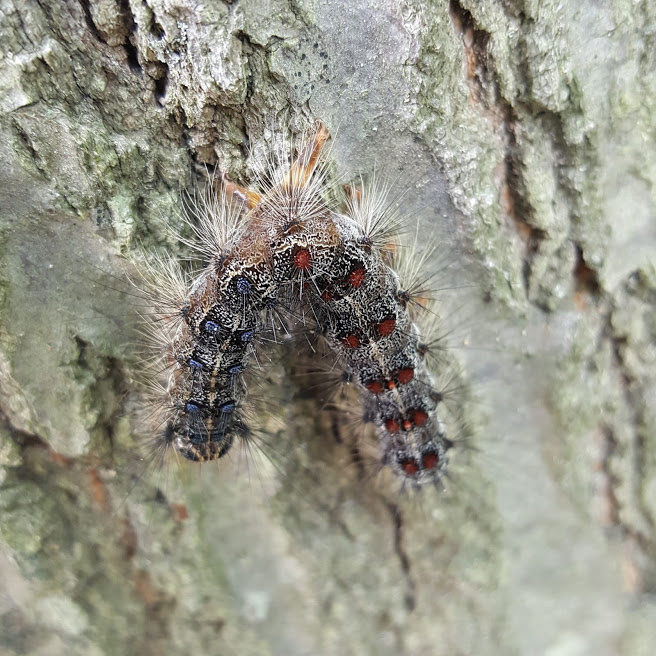
Killed by a virus. Newton, Massachusetts, June 28, 2017.

Gypsy moth populations in different locations show vulnerability to different viral species. Nuclear polyhedrosis virus caused significant mortality in some cases. The most important pathogen is the Lymantria dispar multicapsid nuclear polyhedrosis virus (LdMNPV), sometimes referred to as NPV or Borralinivirus reprimens. Viral particles consumed by the larva when eating through the egg chorion will kill them during the first instar. The bodies disintegrate, spreading the virus on the foliage, which will then be consumed by other larvae. Outbreaks of the virus result in high larva mortality, and the odor of the decaying larvae permeates the area. The pathogen is used as an insecticide under the name Gypchek.

Streptococcus faecalis is another pathogen that is notable for its mortality. Larva killed by the pathogen have a shriveled appearance.

==== Fungi ====
Entomophaga maimaiga is a Japanese fungus that helps control the population of gypsy moths. It was first introduced to North America around 1910, though was not an effective control until the 1980s.

=== Other adaptations ===
Population density of larvae plays a major role in their behavior. At low density, larvae remain inactive during the day, but in high populations become hyperactive.

Interbreeding produces deleterious genetic effects, and dispersal serves to reduce this effect.

==== Weather ====
Temperature is important to the gypsy moth. Low temperatures are fatal. Temperatures of −9 °C (16 °F) can be withstood during the winter, an extended period will kill the larvae inside and −23 °C (−9 °F) even for a short time is lethal. Egg deposits that are low or on the ground can be insulated against temperatures, including snow, and survive the lethal temperatures. Temperatures above 32 °C (90 °F) increase growth and development. Rainfall can drown larvae before they are established; low populations are correlated to heavy rainfall during the larval stage. Wind is also critical to the dispersal of the larvae. Wind speeds of several miles per hour are enough to break the silk threads and disperse the larvae.

==== Pheromones ====
Disparlure has been synthesized artificially and has been used to confuse mating patterns or lead male moths into traps. However, this technique is less successful against concentrated populations, hence its main use may be to delay infestation until other ecological solutions are found.

== Impact ==
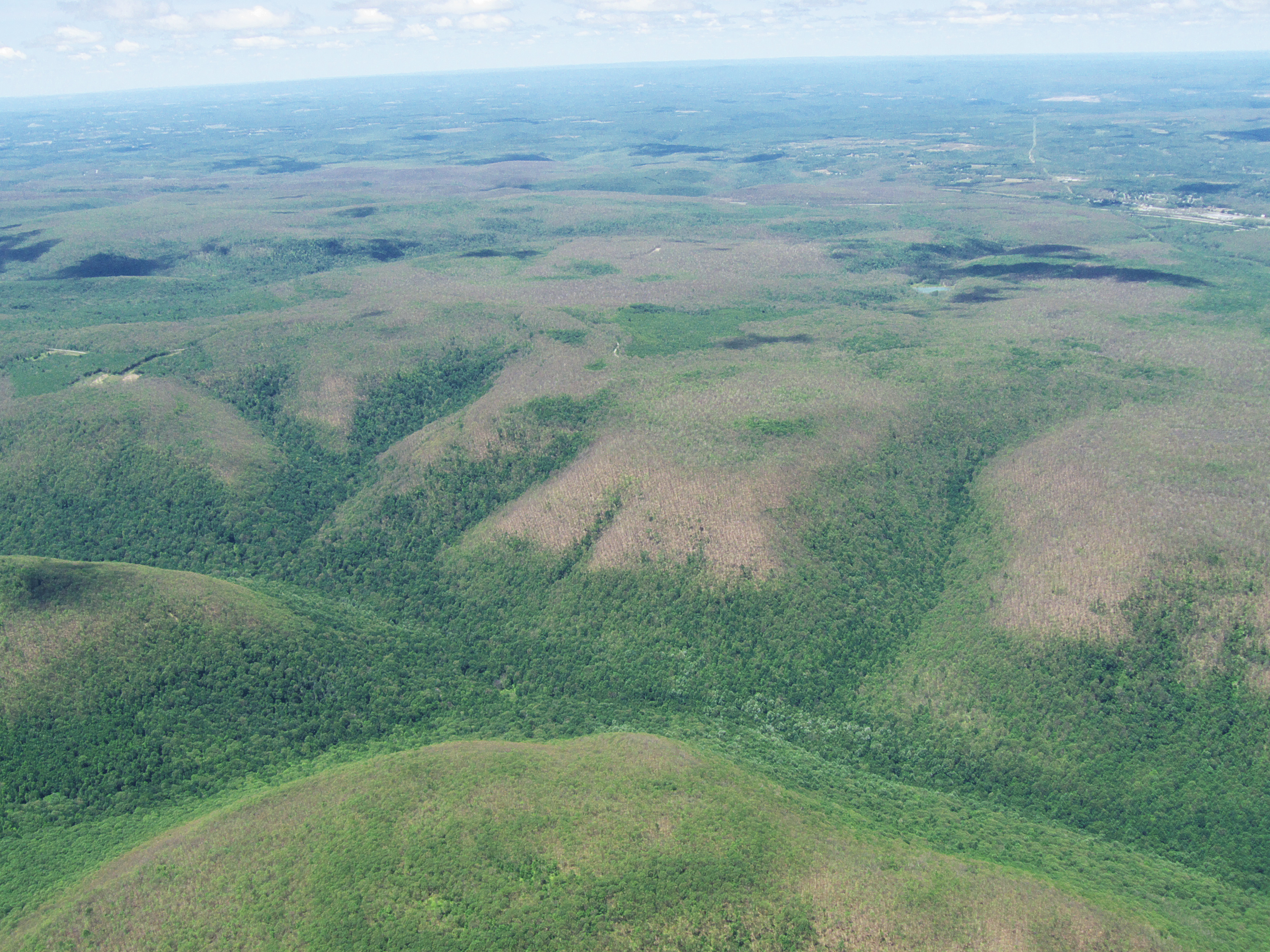
Defoliation of hardwood trees along the Allegheny Front near Snow Shoe, Pennsylvania, in July 2007. The light green patches on hilltops are trees that had begun refoliating by the time this picture was taken.

The gypsy moth habitat overlaps with the northern tiger swallowtail (Papilio canadensis). Experiments indicate that known gypsy moth pathogens and gypsy moth bodily fluid negatively affect the survival of swallowtail larvae. Gypsy moth bodily fluid is lethal, and swallowtail caterpillars were prone to higher rates of parasitism when placed in the field near gypsy moth infestations.

L. d. dispar causes widespread defoliation and costs the economy millions of dollars in damages. Total defoliation in America, from 1970 to 2010, was 80.4 million acres (325,000 km^{2}). The worst year was 1981 with 12.9 million acres (52,000 km^{2}) defoliated. In 2010, 1,207,478 acres (488,649 ha) were defoliated.

Forest defoliation by the gypsy moths each year affects the populations and reproductive success of forest-dwelling birds. Nests placed in defoliated sites suffered a higher predation rate than those in non-defoliated sites. gypsy moths have a direct impact on avian behavior in the American forests.

=== Rash ===
The caterpillar has been reported to produce a poison ivy–like rash when some people come into contact with the hairs of the larvae (caterpillar) stage. The contact can be direct or even if the small hairs are carried by the wind and onto the skin or clothing of a person. Such rashes were documented in the early 1980s, during a major infestation in the Northeastern United States. In coastal Maine and Cape Cod, Massachusetts, caterpillar-triggered rash is much more likely due to exposure to brown-tail moth (Euproctis chrysorrhoea).
