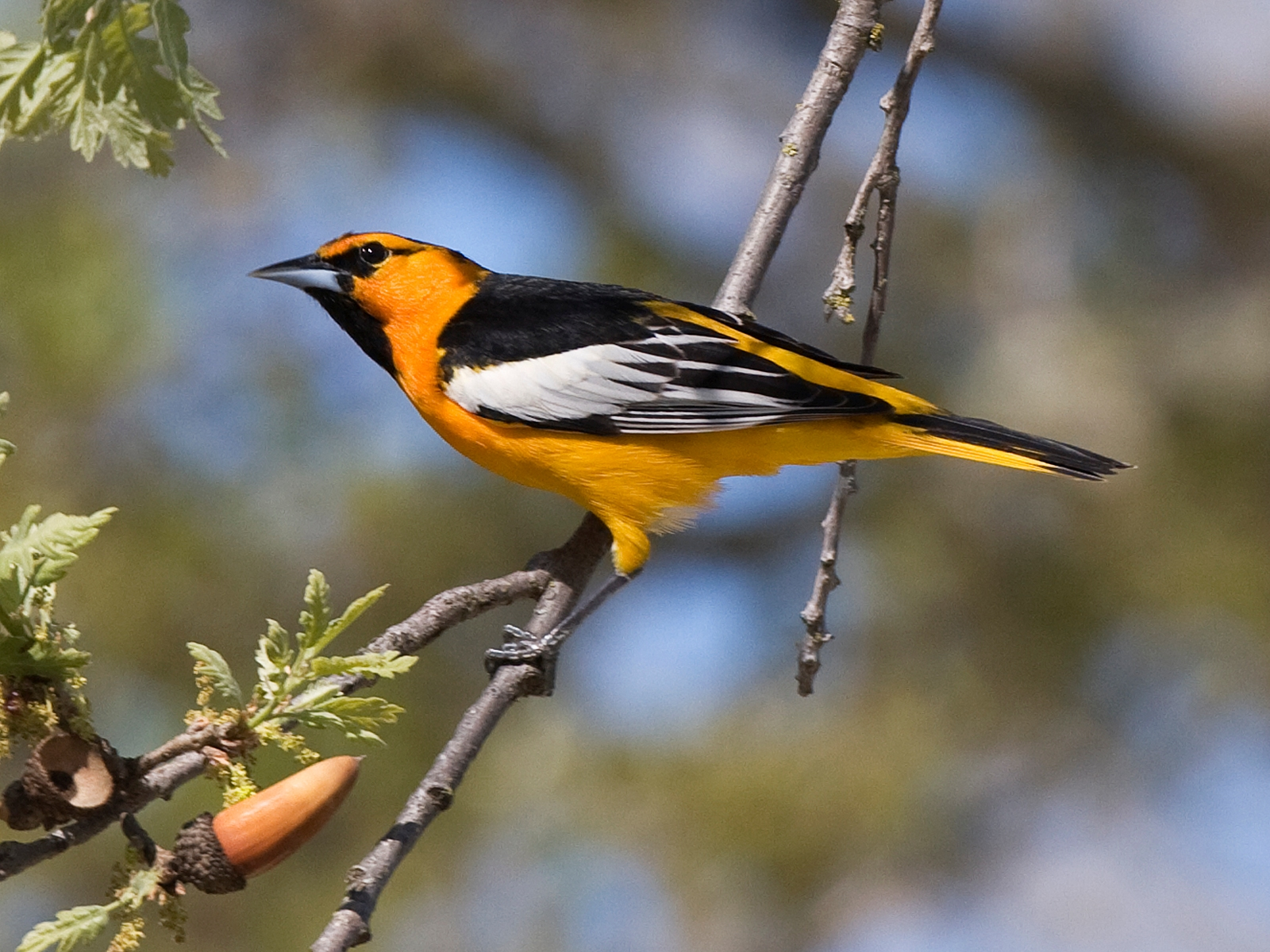
- Male
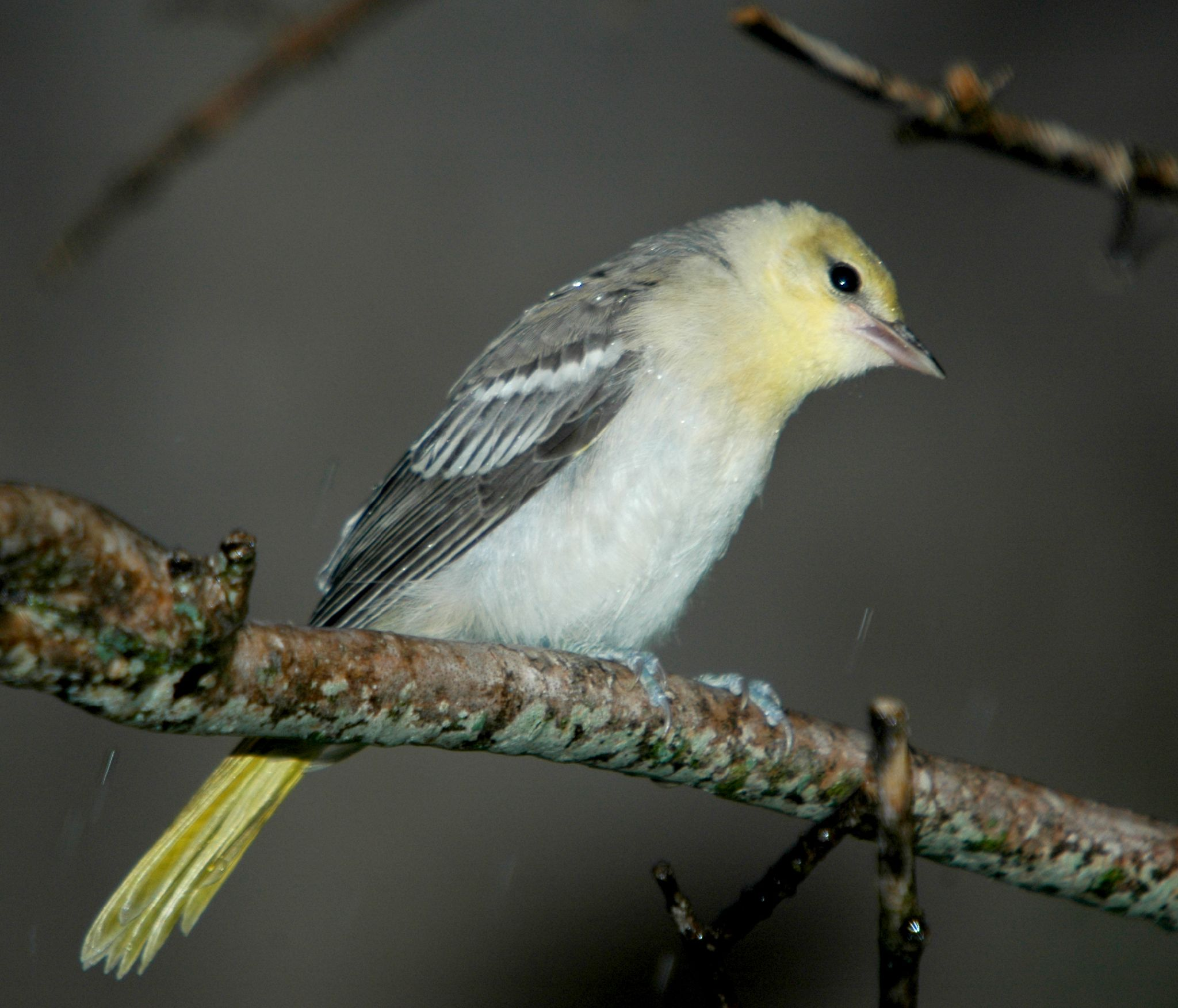
- Female

Conservation status
- Least Concern (IUCN 3.1)

Scientific classification
- Kingdom: Animalia
- Phylum: Chordata
- Class: Aves
- Order: Passeriformes
- Family: Icteridae
- Genus: Icterus
- Species: I. bullockiorum

Binomial name
- Icterus bullockiorum (Swainson, 1827)
- Range Breeding range Wintering range

= Bullock's oriole =

Species of bird

Bullock's oriole (Icterus bullockiorum, also known as Icterus bullockii) is a small New World blackbird. At one time, this species and the Baltimore oriole were considered to be a single species, the northern oriole. This bird is named after William Bullock, an English amateur naturalist.

== Description ==
Bullock's orioles are sexually dimorphic, with males being more brightly colored than females. In addition, adult males tend to be slightly larger and heavier than females.

Measurements:

- Length: 6.7–7.5 inches (17–19 cm)
- Weight: 1.0–1.5 ounces (28–43 g)
- Wingspan: 12.2 inches (31 cm)

Adults have a pointed bill with a straight culmen. In adult males, the tail is long, square, and jet black. All exposed skin is black, as are the claws and bill, though the base of the lower mandible lightens to bluish-gray.

Adult males are characterized by contrasting yellow-orange and black plumage, a black throat patch, and a white wing patch on the wing coverts. The underparts, breast, and face are orange or yellow; by contrast, the back, wings, and tail are black. A black line extends from each eye to the black crown. Adult females, by contrast, have gray-brown upperparts, duller yellow on the breast and underparts, and an olive crown. Some females may also have a dark throat patch, similar to (but less extensive than) the one found in adult males; in all cases, females lack the black eye-line present in adult males. Females with throat patches are thought to be older individuals.

Following the general pattern observed among icterids, the overall plumage pattern seen in immature male Bullock's orioles closely resembles that seen in adult females. Juveniles resemble adult females, but have darker wings, fresh wing coverts, and a pink or whitish bill. Sexual dimorphism is not obvious in juveniles.

== Reproduction ==
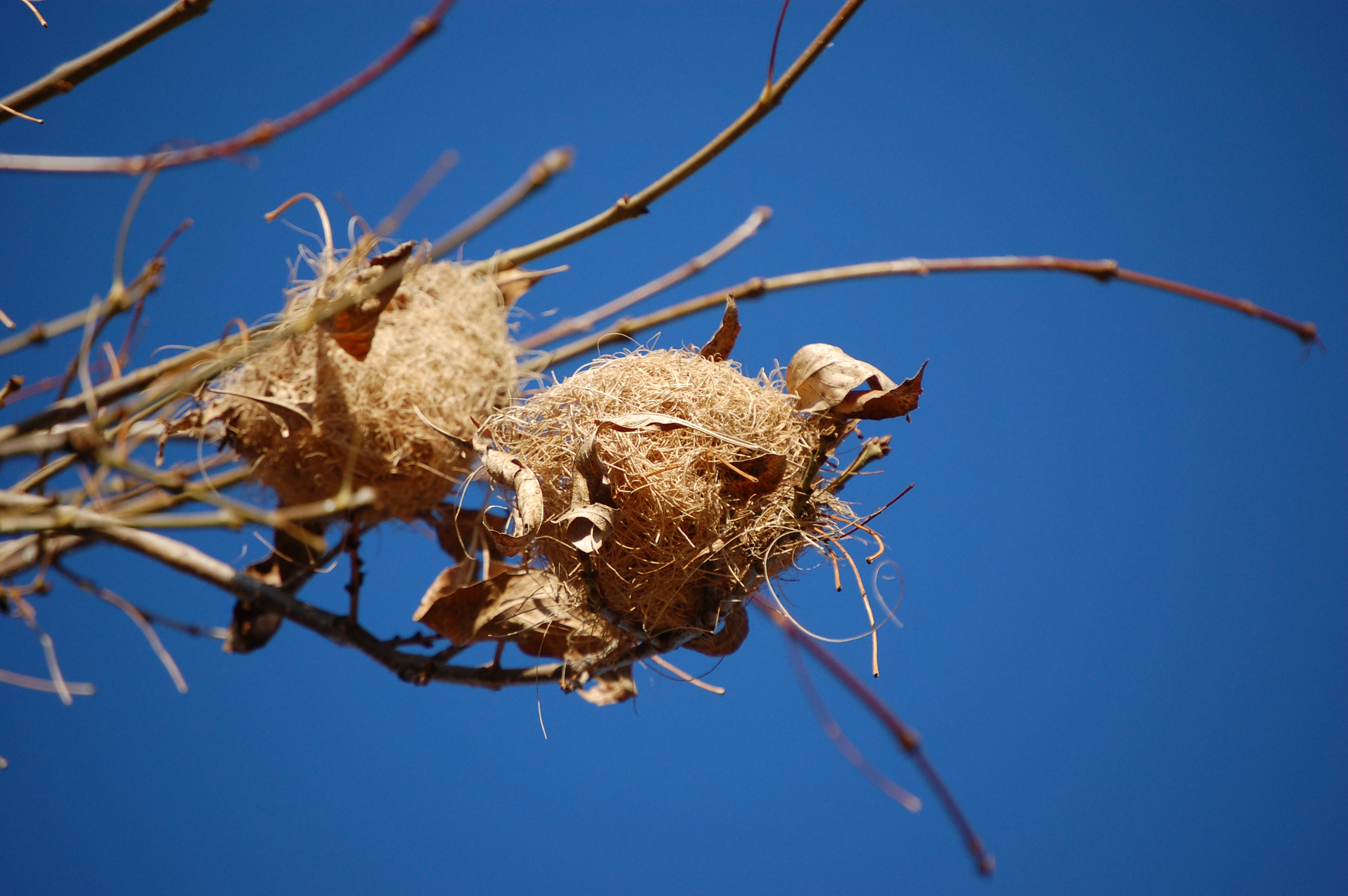
Bullock's oriole nests near San Jose, California

Bullock's orioles are seasonally monogamous. The breeding season typically lasts from May until July. The exact timing of the beginning of the breeding season tends to vary geographically; in general, breeding begins later in the northernmost and westernmost portions of its geographic range. Mated pairs of Bullock's orioles cooperate to weave deep, pendant baskets in which are deposited between three and six eggs, though females tend to do much of the work. The nest is woven of plant fibers, primarily bark and fine grass fiber, though animal hair is also commonly used. The nest is lined with down, hair, and moss.

Both males and females rear the young and defend the nest from predators and nest parasites.

Bullock's orioles and Baltimore orioles typically hybridize in the Midwest, where their geographic ranges overlap.

== Communication ==
Both males and females sing. While males have a sweeter voice, females tend to be more prolific singers. This bird's song is similar to that of the Baltimore oriole, but faster and somewhat more harsh.

== Distribution ==
Bullock's orioles are native to western North America, though they are sometimes found as vagrants in the eastern half of the continent. During the breeding season, they are found as far west as the eastern foothills of the Cascade Range. Their breeding range stretches east to the Dakotas, Kansas, and northern Central Texas. This species can be found as far north as British Columbia in Canada and as far south as Sonora or Durango in Mexico. It is common throughout its range, but is absent in parts of Arizona and Idaho, where a combination of extreme elevation and an arid climate make for poor living conditions. During winter, this species retreats to Mexico and northern Central America. Its winter range extends south and east from Sinaloa to Oaxaca.

== Behavior ==
=== Habitat ===
Like other members of the Icteridae, Bullock's orioles prefer habitat edges. They especially prefer riparian corridors, open deciduous woodland, and scrub forest. Observations during the breeding season indicate that members of this species prefer areas with an abundance of cottonwood, pecan, and (if near water) willow. In dry areas, this species prefers salt cedar and mesquite. In California, eucalyptus trees are used as major sources of nectar.

=== Diet ===
These birds forage in trees and shrubs, also making short flights to catch insects. They mainly eat insects, berries, and nectar. Other fruits eaten include oranges and sometimes grapes. In some locations, they may be seen using hummingbird feeders. A common method of attracting Bullock's orioles involves setting out a dish of grape jelly and water.

== Related species ==
For a time Bullock's orioles were considered conspecific with Baltimore orioles, but breeding data, later followed by data on molt timing and DNA, showed that Bullock's orioles are a distinct species.
