= Anastatus disparis =

Scientific classification
- Kingdom: Animalia
- Phylum: Arthropoda
- Clade: Pancrustacea
- Class: Insecta
- Order: Hymenoptera
- Family: Eupelmidae
- Genus: Anastatus
- Species: A. disparis

Binomial name
- Anastatus disparis Ruschka, 1921

Species of parasitoid

Anastatus disparis is a species of wasp, and an egg parasitoid. Hosts include Lymantria dispar and Antheraea pernyi. The species is sexually dimorphic, with 630 sex specific genes. Females have 11 antennal subsegments, whereas males have 8. Females only mate once, and males are significantly shorter lived than females, engaging in agonistic behavior.
