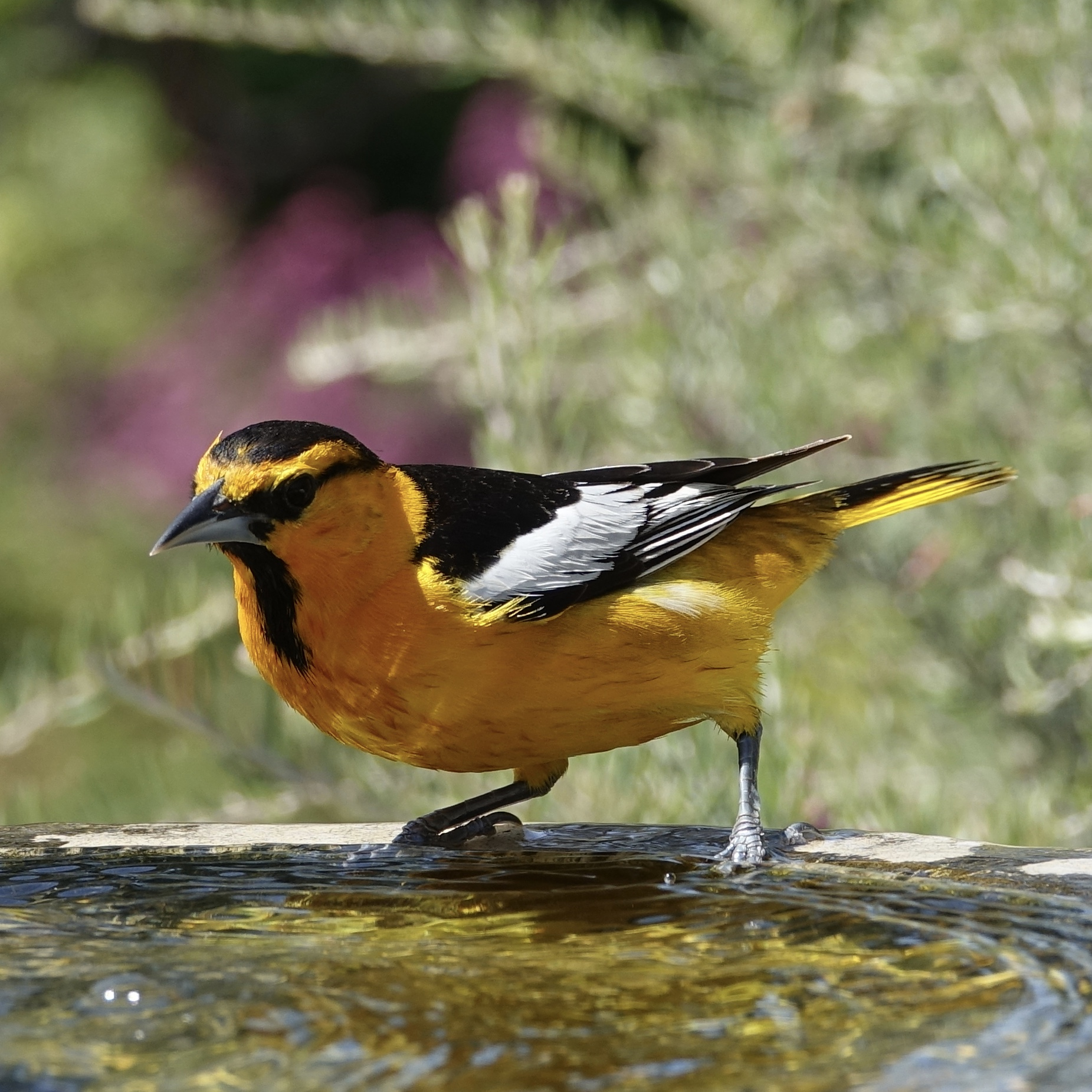
- Bullock's oriole (Icterus bullockii)

Scientific classification
- Kingdom: Animalia
- Phylum: Chordata
- Class: Aves
- Order: Passeriformes
- Family: Icteridae
- Genus: Icterus

Species
- I. galbula; I. bullockii

= Northern oriole =

Former name of bird species

The northern oriole (Icterus galbula), considered a species of North American bird from 1973 to 1995, brought together the eastern Baltimore oriole, Icterus galbula, and the western Bullock's oriole, Icterus bullockii. Observations of interbreeding between the Baltimore and the Bullock's oriole led to this classification as a single species. Research by James Rising, a professor of zoology at the University of Toronto, and others subsequently showed that the two birds did not interbreed significantly.
