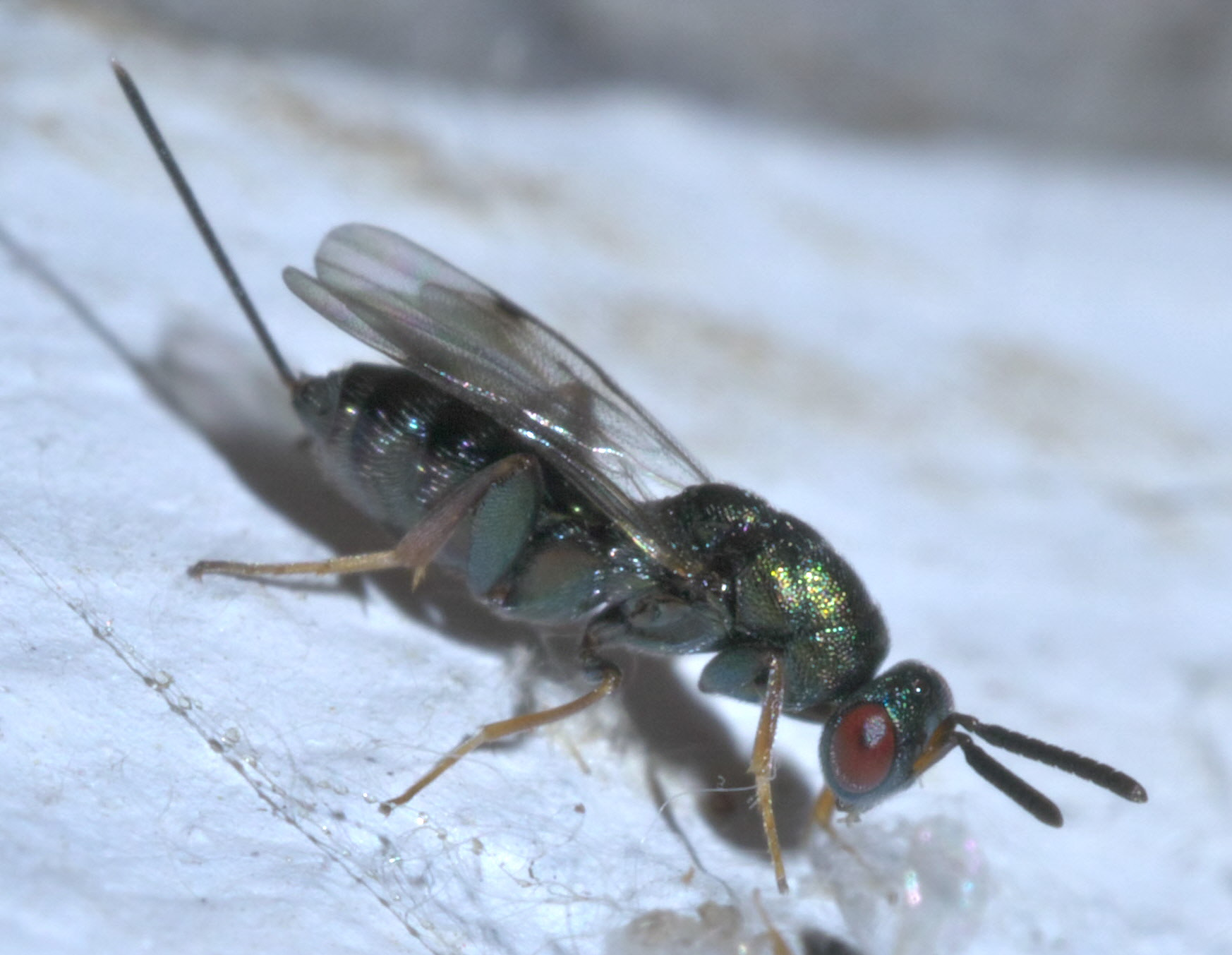

Scientific classification
- Kingdom: Animalia
- Phylum: Arthropoda
- Class: Insecta
- Order: Hymenoptera
- Family: Torymidae
- Subfamily: Toryminae
- Genus: Monodontomerus

= Monodontomerus =

Genus of wasps

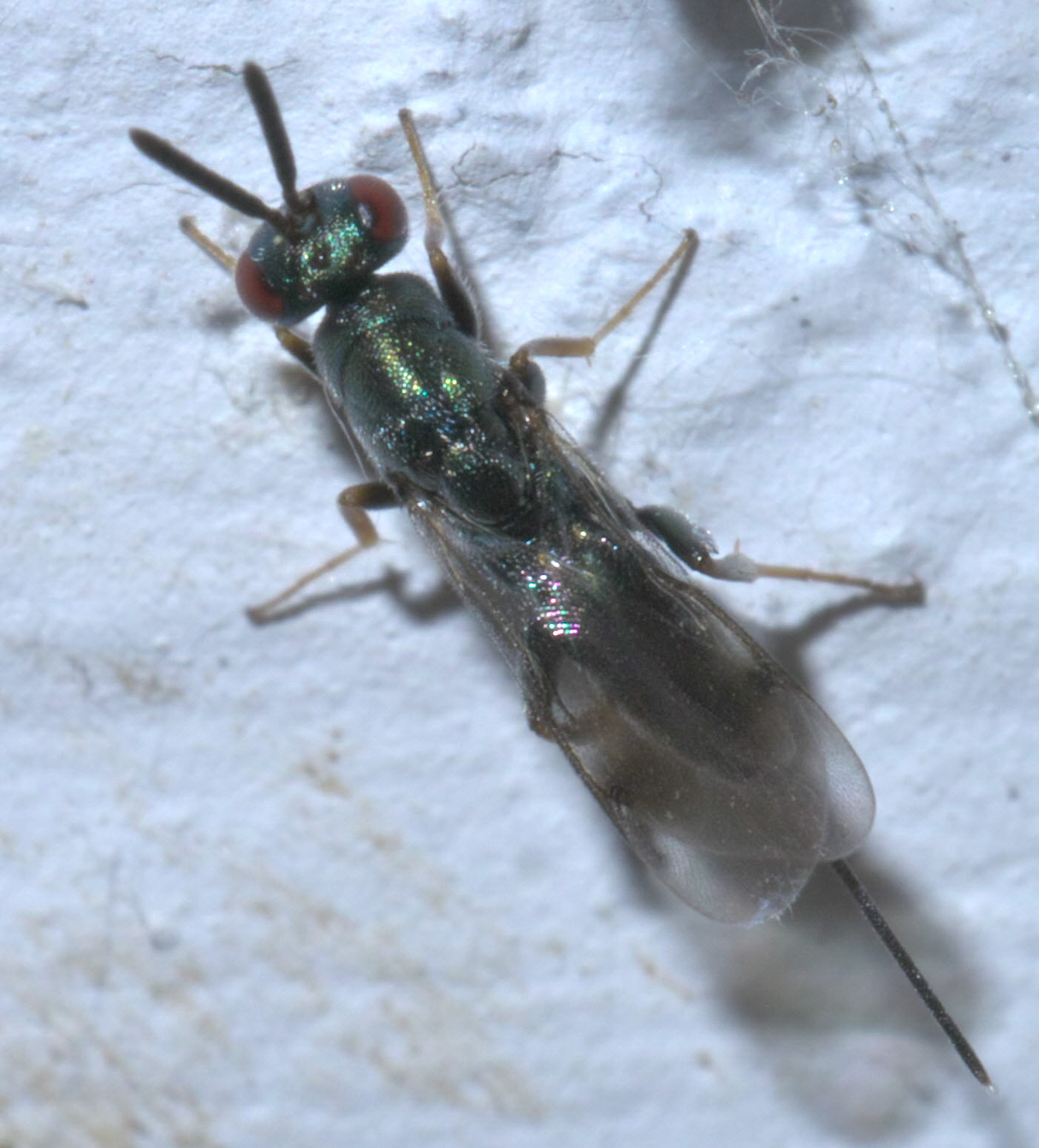
Monodontomerus, Size: 4.3 mm to wingtip

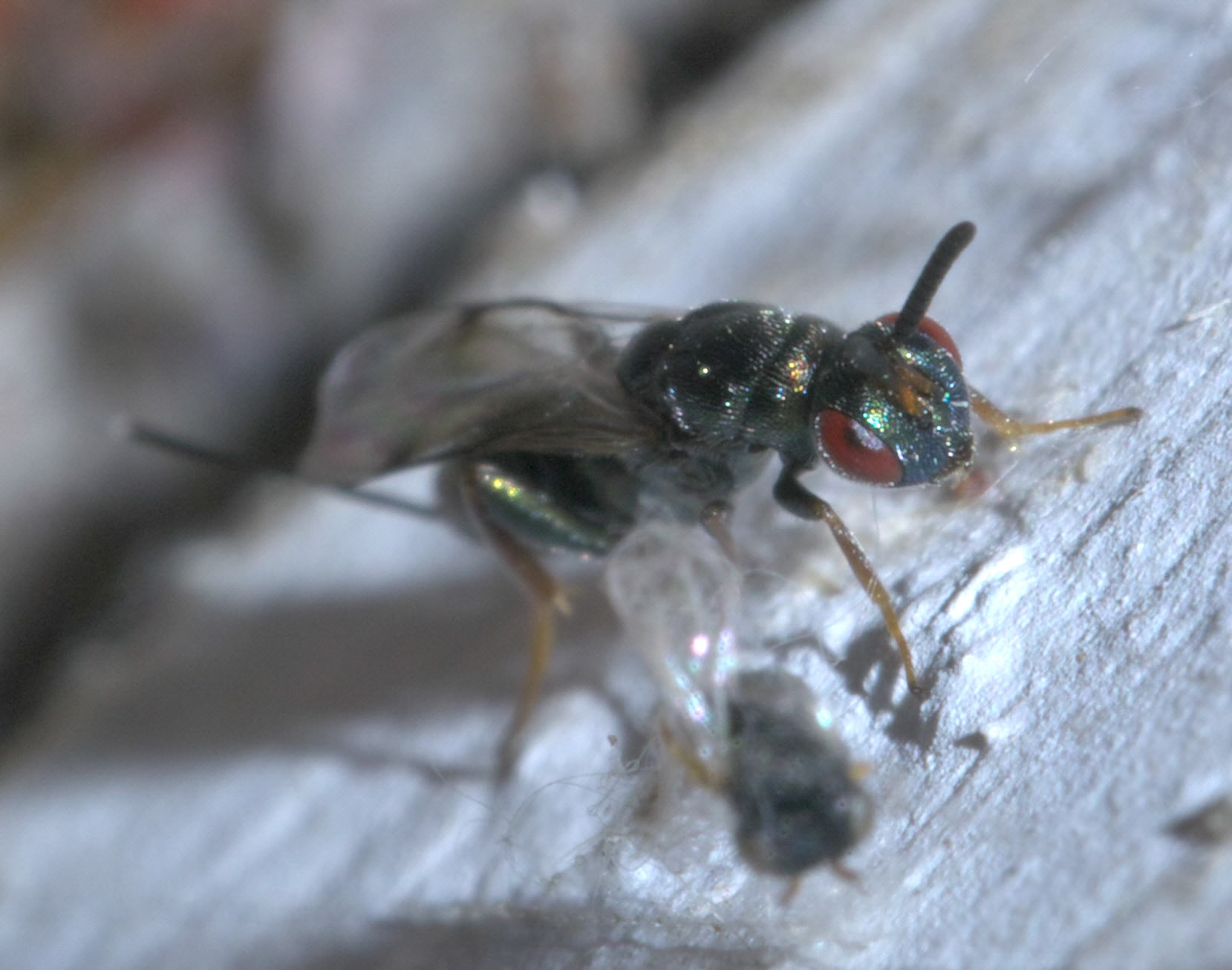
Monodontomerus

Monodontomerus is a genus of wasps in the family Torymidae; they are parasitoids of various insect orders.
