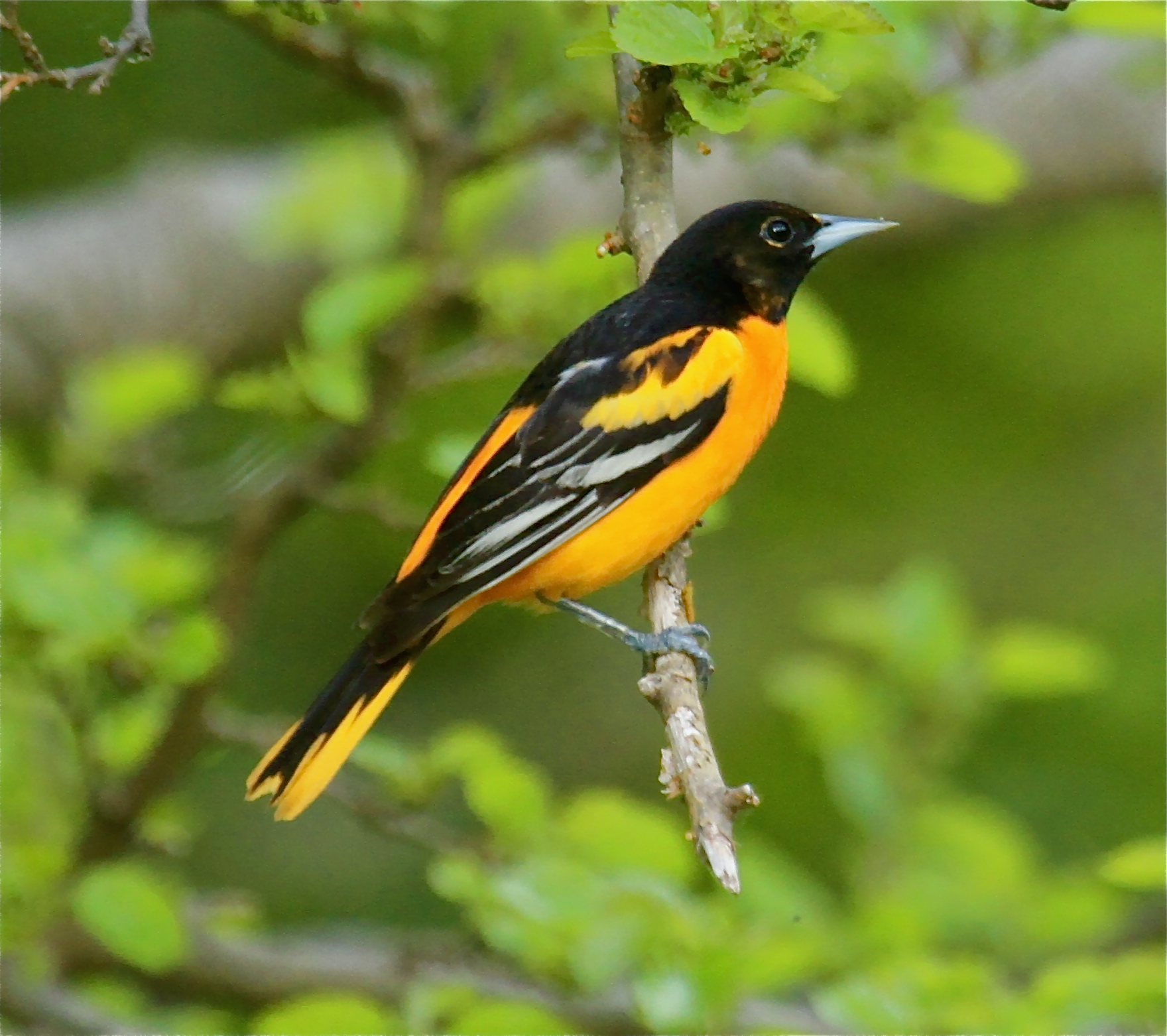
- Adult male
- Male Baltimore oriole singing

Conservation status
- Least Concern (IUCN 3.1)

Scientific classification
- Kingdom: Animalia
- Phylum: Chordata
- Class: Aves
- Order: Passeriformes
- Family: Icteridae
- Genus: Icterus
- Species: I. galbula

Binomial name
- Icterus galbula (Linnaeus, 1758)
- Range of I. galbula Breeding range Wintering range Note: range in Venezuela, Hispaniola, Puerto Rico, and the rest of the Caribbean not shown

Synonyms
- Coracias galbula Linnaeus, 1758; Oriolus galbula Linnaeus, 1766

= Baltimore oriole =

Species of bird

The Baltimore oriole (Icterus galbula) is a small icterid blackbird common in eastern North America as a migratory breeding bird. It received its common name from the resemblance of the male's colors to those on the coat-of-arms of 17th-century Lord Baltimore. Observations of interbreeding between the Baltimore oriole and the western Bullock's oriole Icterus bullockii, led to both being classified as a single species, called the northern oriole, from 1973 to 1995. Research by James Rising, a professor of zoology at the University of Toronto, and others showed that the two birds actually did not interbreed significantly.

The Baltimore oriole is the state bird of Maryland, and the namesake and mascot for the Baltimore Orioles baseball team.

== Taxonomy ==
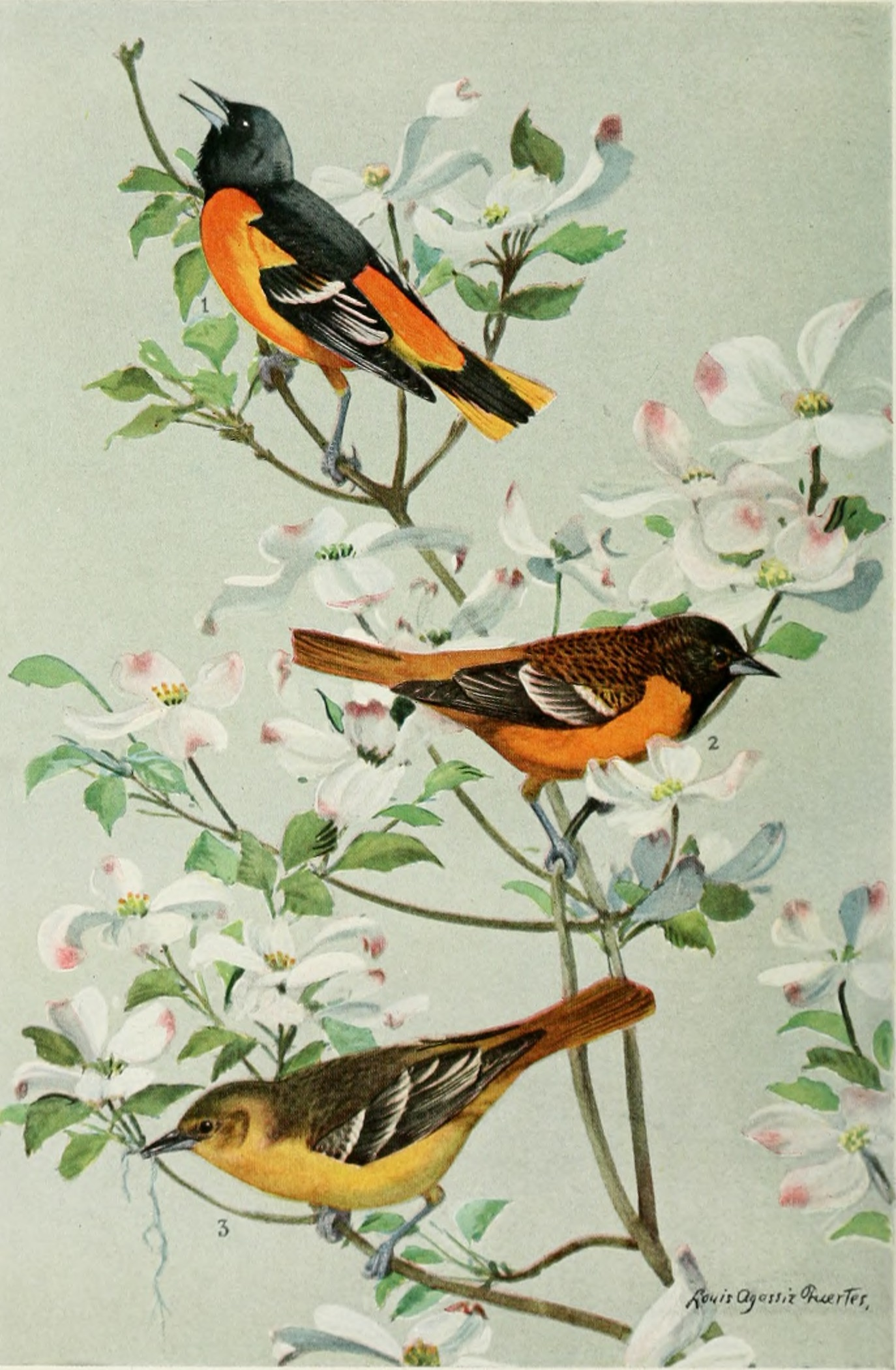
Baltimore orioles

The Baltimore oriole was formally described in 1758 by the Swedish naturalist Carl Linnaeus in the tenth edition of his Systema Naturae under the binomial name Coracias galbula. He specified the type locality as America, but this was restricted to Virginia in 1931. Linnaeus based his account on the "Baltimore-Bird" that had been described and illustrated by the English naturalist Mark Catesby in his The Natural History of Carolina, Florida and the Bahama Islands that was published between 1729 and 1732. The Baltimore oriole is now one of 32 New World orioles placed in the genus Icterus that was introduced in 1760 by the French ornithologist Mathurin Jacques Brisson. The species is monotypic: no subspecies are recognised.

Like all New World orioles, this species is named after an unrelated, physically similar family found in the Old World: the Oriolidae. The word "Oriole" ultimately derives from the Latin aureolus, "golden". The genus name Icterus is from the Ancient Greek ikteros, a yellow bird, usually taken to be the Eurasian golden oriole, the sight of which was thought to cure jaundice. The specific galbula is the Latin name for a yellow bird, again usually assumed to be the golden oriole.

== Description ==
This medium-sized passerine measures 17–22 cm (6.7–8.7 in) in length and spans 23–32 cm (9.1–12.6 in) across the wings. Their build is typical of icterids, as they have a sturdy body, a longish tail, fairly long legs and a thick, pointed bill. The body weight averages 33.8 g (1.19 oz), with a range of weights from 22.3 to 42 g (0.79 to 1.48 oz). The male oriole is slightly larger than the female, although the size dimorphism is minimal by icterid standards. Adults always have white bars on the wings.

The adult male is orange on the underparts, shoulder patch, and rump, with some birds appearing a very deep flaming orange and others appearing yellowish orange. All of the rest of the male's plumage is black. The adult female is yellow brown on the upper parts with darker wings, and dull orange yellow on the breast and belly. The juvenile oriole is similar looking to the female, with males taking until the fall of their second year to reach adult plumage.

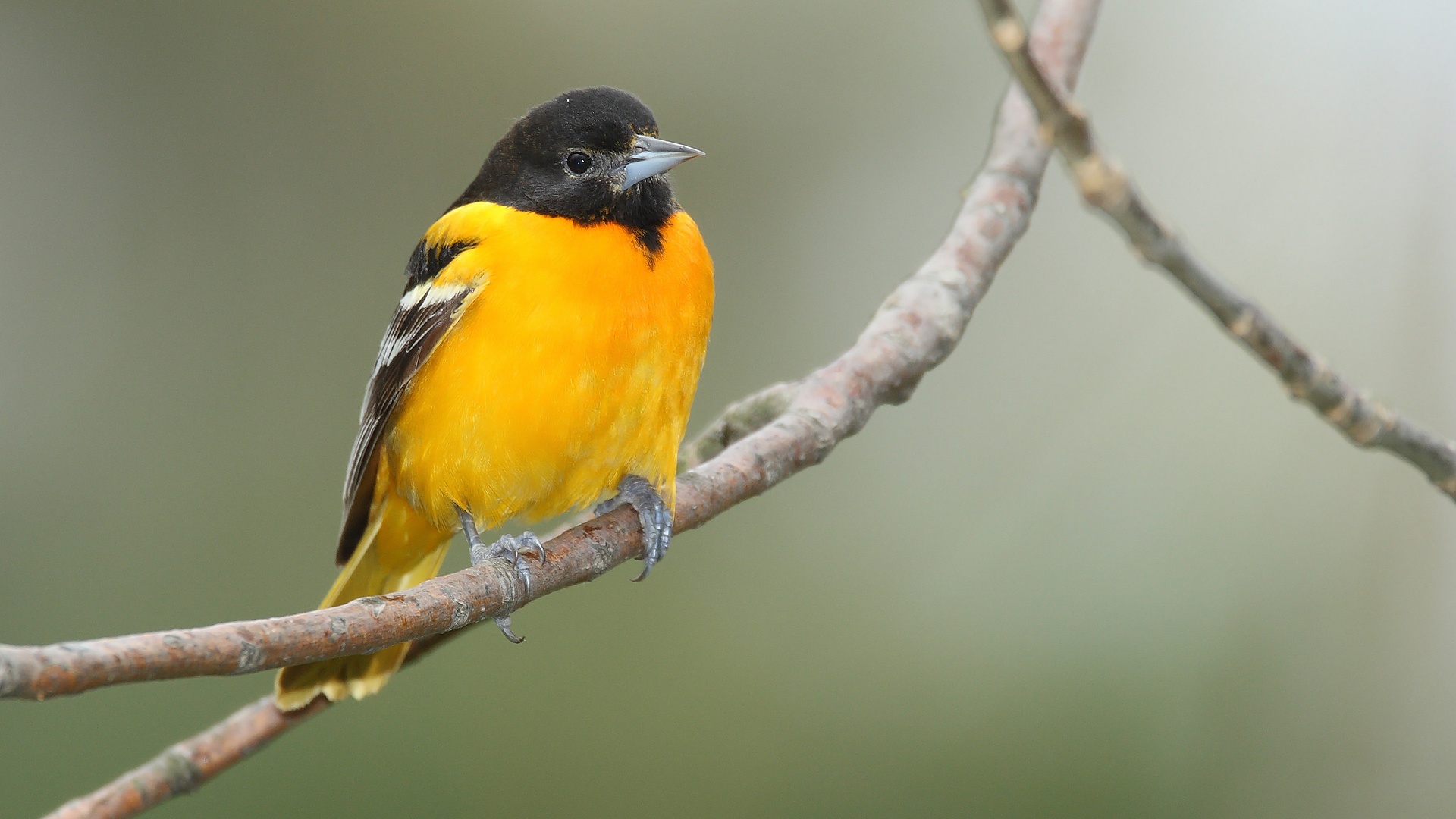
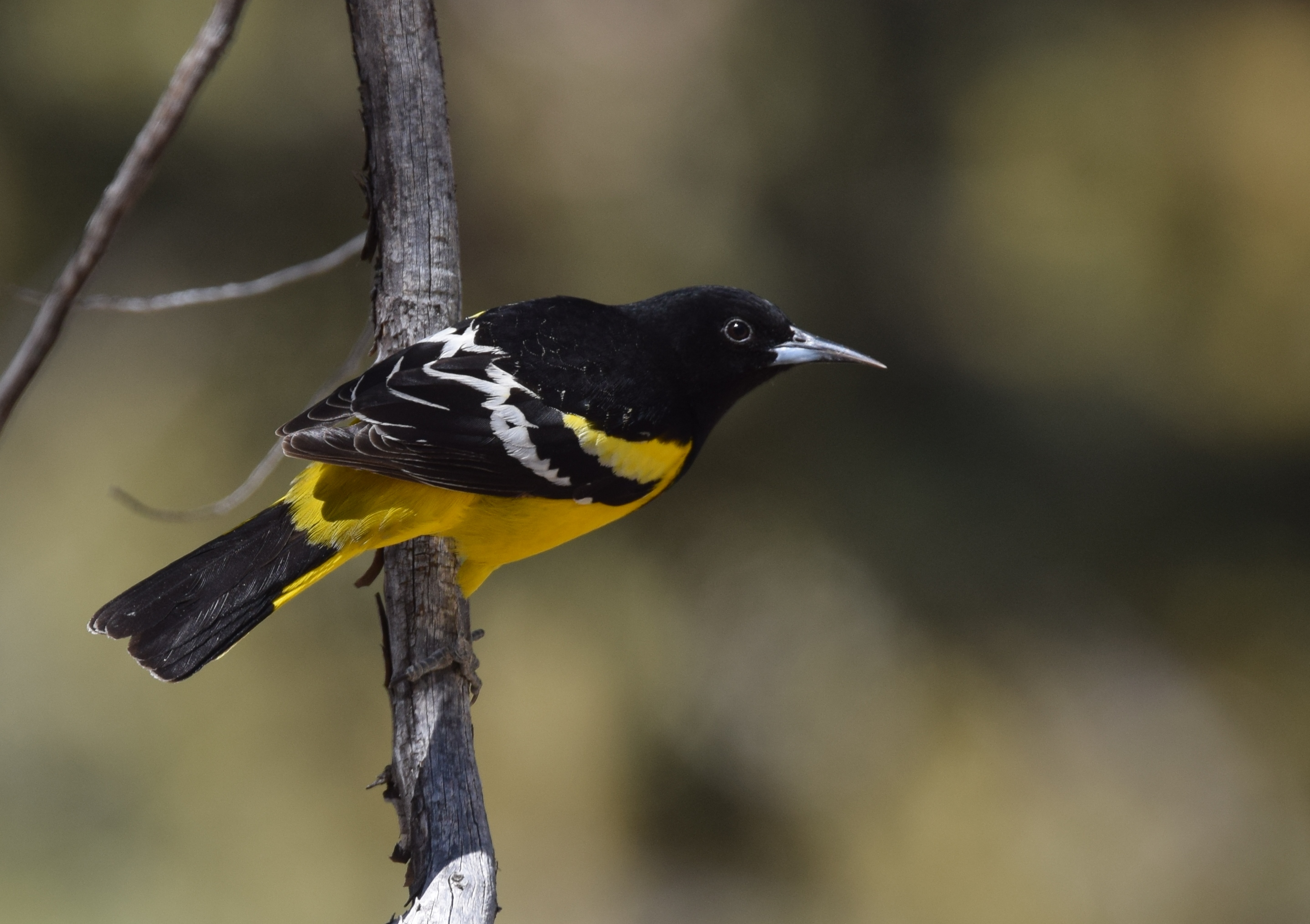
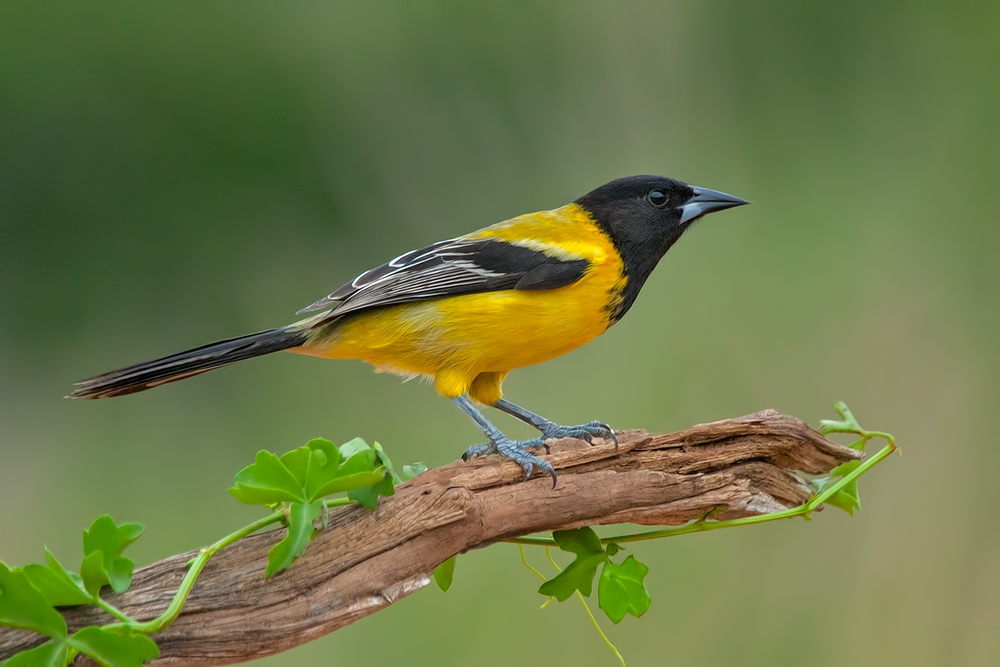
Some adult males (left) may lack the vivid orange coloration associated with the species, causing them to strongly resemble the yellow Scott's oriole (center) or similar Audubon's oriole (right).

== Distribution and habitat ==
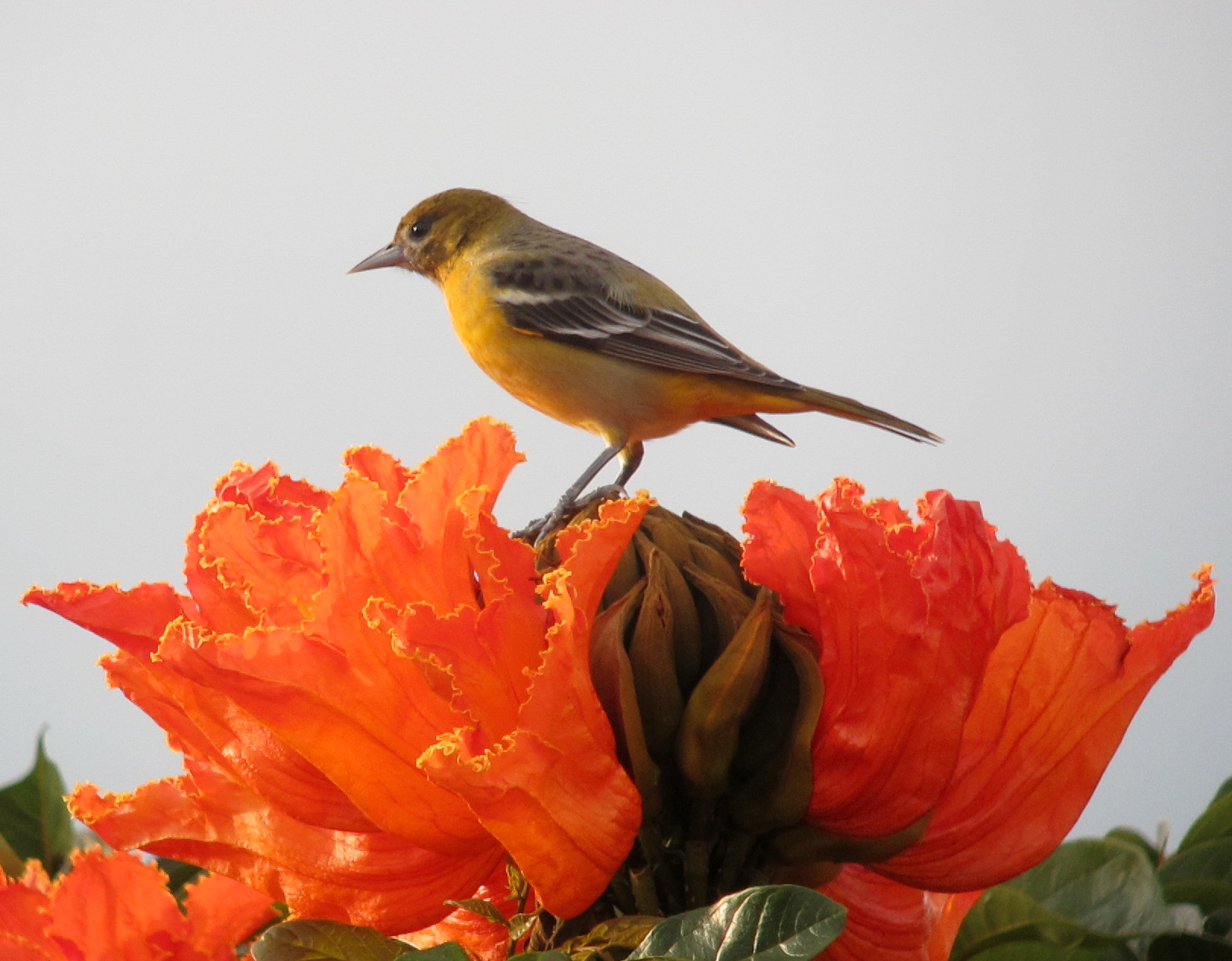
Adult female

Baltimore orioles live in the Nearctic in summer, including the Canadian Prairies and eastern Montana in the northwest eastward through southern Ontario, southern Quebec and New Brunswick and south through the eastern United States to central Mississippi and Alabama and northern Georgia. They migrate to winter in the Neotropics as far north as Mexico and sometimes the southern coast of the United States, but predominantly in Central America and northern South America. Some areas of the southern United States may retain orioles all winter if they have feeders that appeal to them. The range of this bird overlaps with that of the similar Bullock's oriole in the Midwest, and the two species were once considered to be conspecific under the name northern oriole because they form fertile hybrids. The Baltimore oriole is a rare vagrant to Western Europe.

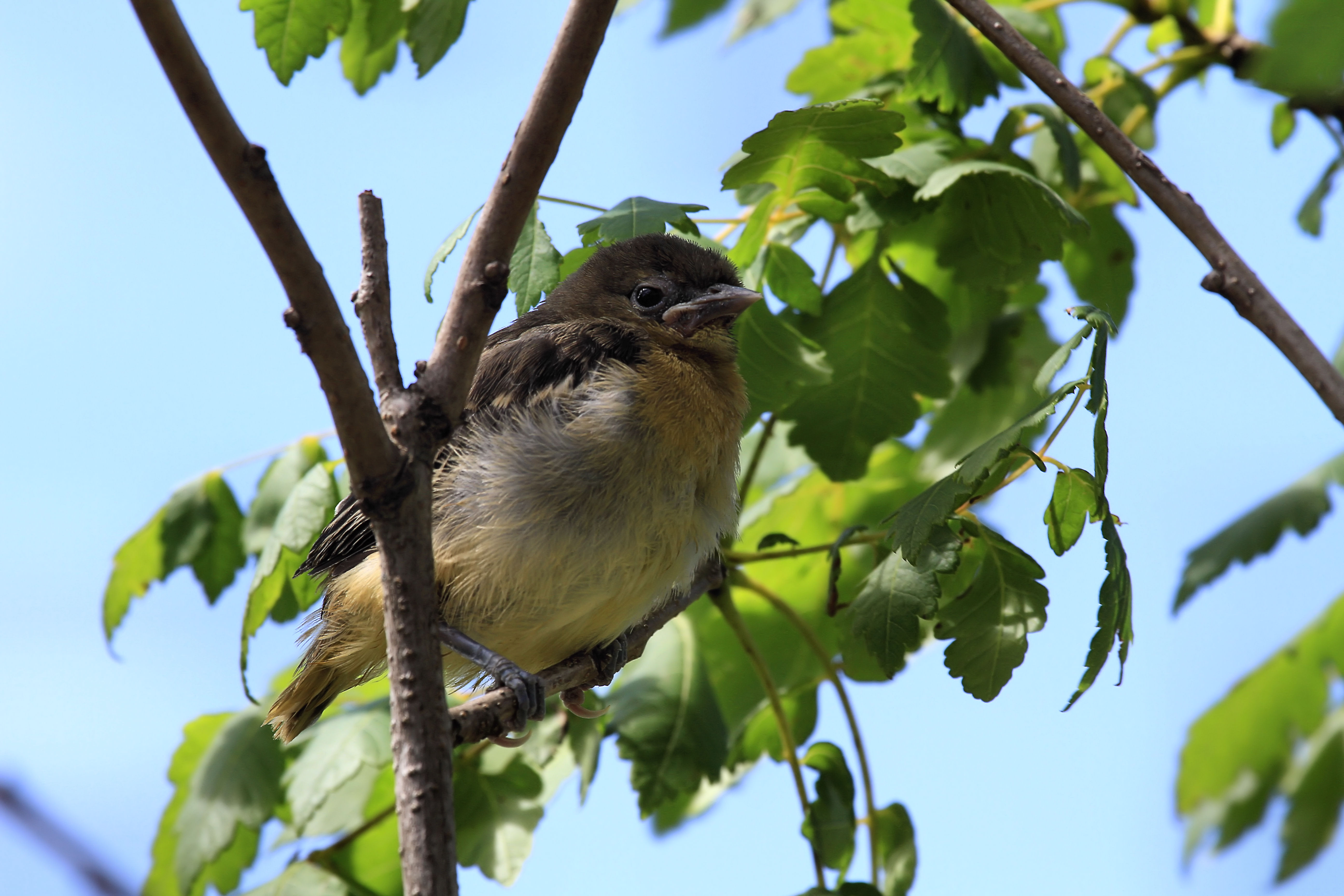
Juvenile in Maryland, United States

Baltimore orioles are often found high up in large, leafy deciduous trees, but do not generally reside in deep forests. The species has been found in summer and migration in open woodland, forest edge, and partially wooded wetlands or stands of trees along rivers. They are very adaptable and can breed in a variety of secondary habitats. In recent times, they are often found in orchards, farmland, urban parks and suburban landscapes as long as they retain woodlots. In Mexico, they winter in flowering canopy trees, often over shade coffee plantations.

From 1966 to 2015, the Baltimore oriole experienced a greater than 1.5% annual population decrease throughout the northern and eastern parts of its breeding range. Among other causes Dutch elm disease destroyed a meaningful amount of their favorite nesting locations: elm trees.

== Behavior ==
=== Song and calls ===
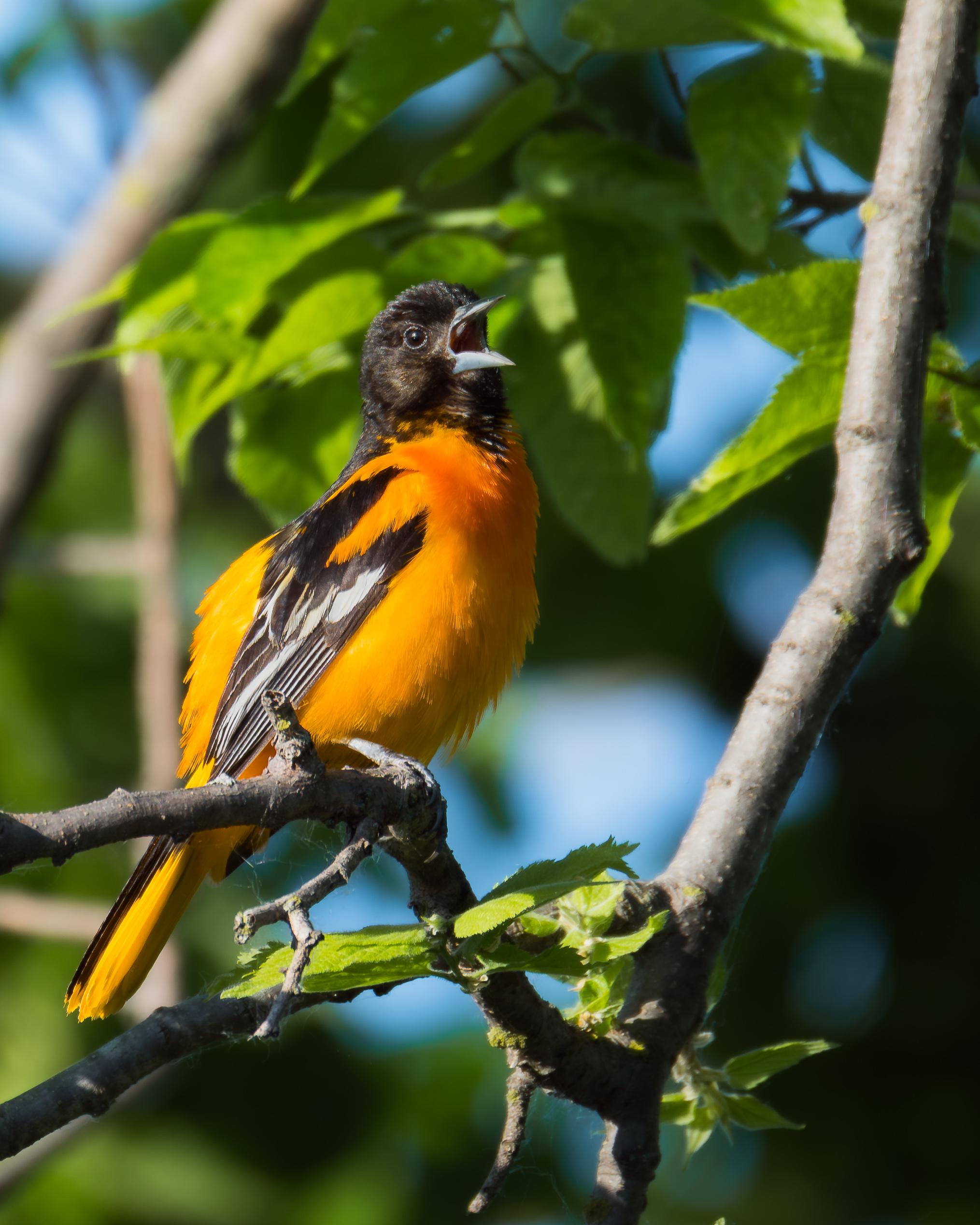
Singing

The Baltimore orioles' song is a short set of recognizable, sweet whistles that sound like "tyew, pyeer, peededoo, and "teer." Calls include "veeer," which is an unusual nasal sound, a low chatter call, and two high calls which sound like "tyew-li and kleek."

The male Baltimore oriole song is a clear whistle with a vibrant tone that flows and includes a brief sequence of notes that are paired and repeated 2-7 times, lasting 1-2 seconds. Sometimes during breeding season mature male orioles will make a "flutter-drum sound" to each other while in flight by making noise as they move their wings. Male orioles sing to proclaim and protect territory. The female Baltimore oriole also sings to communicate and while protecting her nest she gives a distinctive call which sounds like a fierce screech. Both male and female orioles make specific warning calls that sound like inharmonious chatter during combative confrontations. If there are other species of orioles in the area that hear the chatter, they will respond to alert calls and try to help defend the territory.

Song of the Baltimore oriole

=== Breeding ===
Baltimore orioles are basically solitary outside their mating season. The species is generally considered monogamous, although evidence suggests that extra-pair copulation is relatively common. In the spring, males establish a territory and then display to females by singing and chattering while hopping from perch to perch in front of them. Males also give a bow display, bowing with wings lowered and tail fanned. Depending on their receptiveness, the females may ignore these displays or sing and give calls or a wing-quiver display in response. The wing-quiver display involves leaning forward, often with the tail partly fanned, and fluttering or quivering slightly lowered wings.

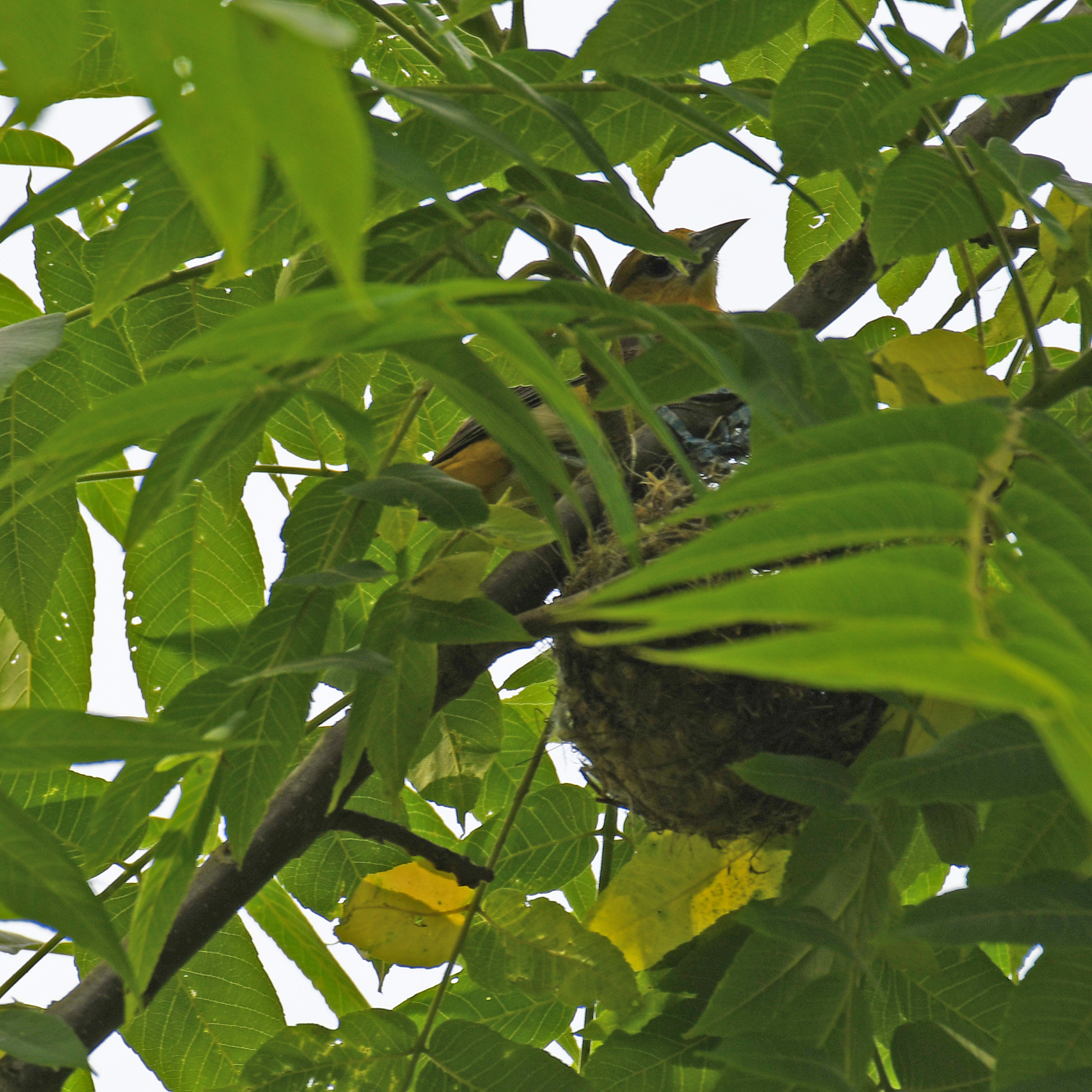
Baltimore oriole with nest

The Baltimore oriole's nest is built by the female. It is a tightly woven, bundle-like pouch located on the end of a branch, consisting of any fine plant or animal materials available, hanging down on the underside. Trees such as elm, cottonwood, maple, willow, or apple are regularly selected, with the nest usually located around 7 to 9 m (23 to 30 ft) above the ground. The female lays three to seven eggs, with the norm being around four. The eggs are pale gray to bluish-white, measuring 2.3 cm × 1.6 cm (0.91 in × 0.63 in) on average. The incubation period is 12 to 14 days. Once the nestlings hatch, they are fed by regurgitation by both parents and brooded by the female for two weeks. After this, the young start to fledge, becoming largely independent shortly thereafter. If the eggs, young, or nest are destroyed, the oriole is unable to lay a replacement clutch.

=== Mortality ===
Predation of adults is a common cause of mortality, typically also occurring with eggs, nestlings, and fledglings. Common predators at Baltimore oriole nests can include common grackles, American crows, blue jays, black-billed magpies, tree squirrels, and domestic cats, which most commonly capture newly fledged orioles or adults engaged in brooding behavior. Rapacious birds commonly prey on both young and fully-grown orioles, the most prolific being the eastern screech owl and Cooper's and sharp-shinned hawks. Somewhat larger rapacious birds also sometimes opportunistically prey on the oriole, including peregrine falcons, great horned owls, and barn owls, while merlins may do so while orioles are migrating.

The oldest recorded Baltimore oriole lived to 11 years and 7 months in the wild. They have been recorded living up to 14 years in captivity.

=== Feeding ===
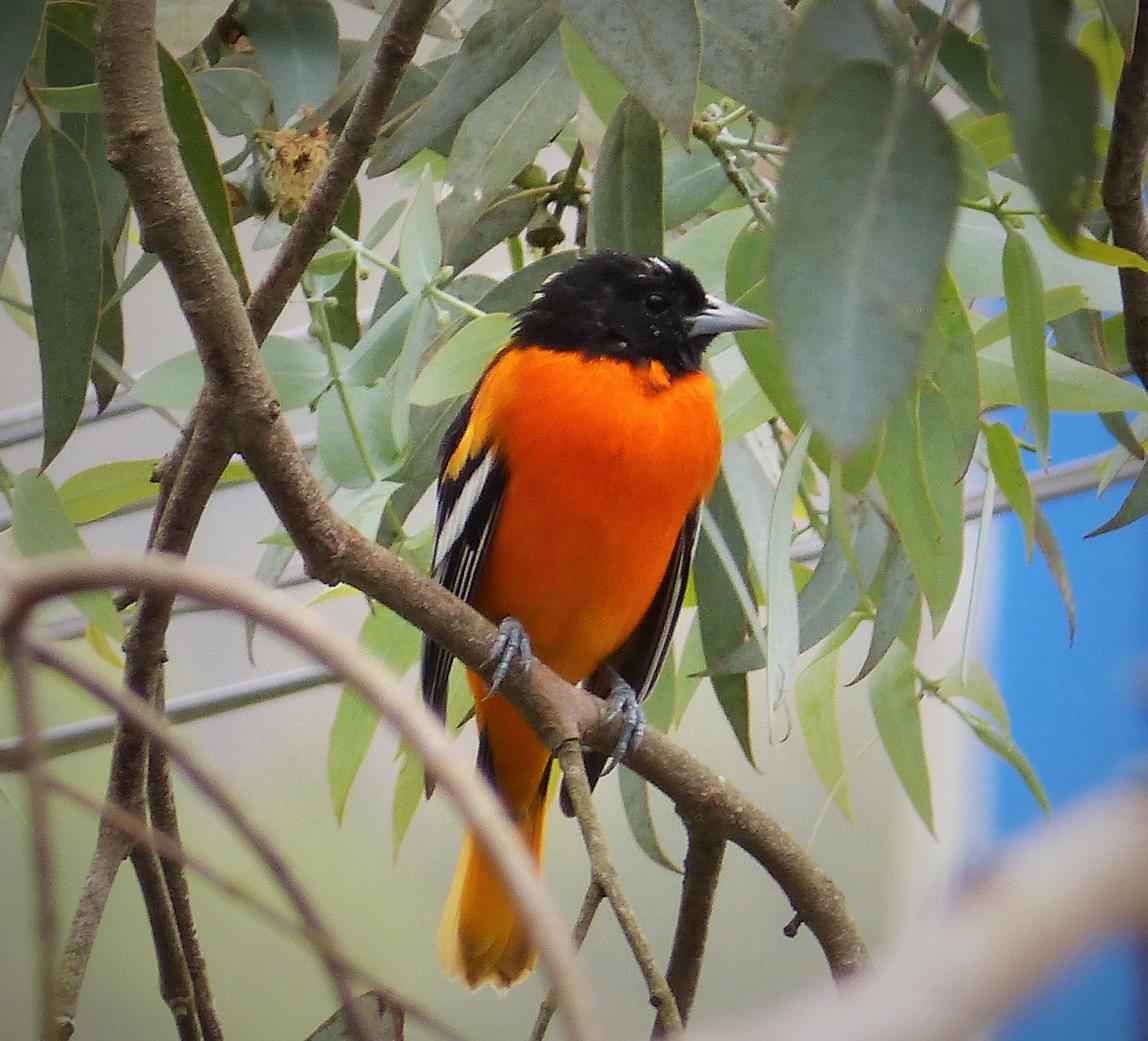
Baltimore oriole, adult male

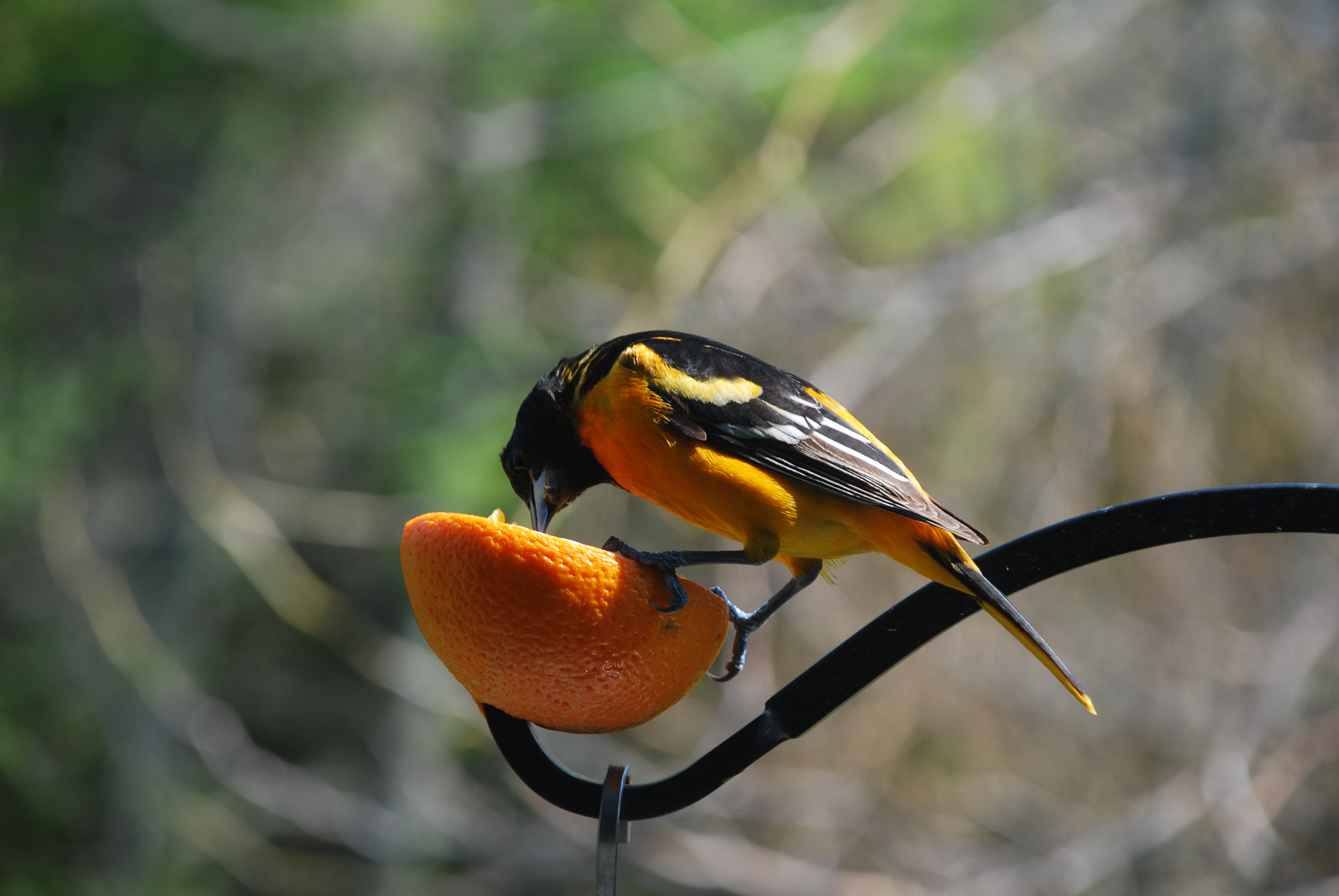
Adult male gaping

Baltimore orioles forage in trees and shrubs, also making short flights to catch insects. They acrobatically clamber, hover, and hang among foliage as they comb high branches. They mainly eat insects, berries, and nectar, and are often seen sipping at hummingbird feeders. Their favored prey is perhaps the forest tent caterpillar moth, which they typically eat in their larval stage, and can be a nuisance species if not naturally regulated by predation. The larvae caterpillar is beaten against a branch until their protective hairs are skinned off before being eaten. They will also consume beetles, grasshoppers, wasps, bugs, and spiders. Baltimore orioles' consumption of forest tent caterpillars at the stage of development when they do the most damage to forest trees and plants, plays an important role in the ecosystem.

Unlike American robins and many other fruit-eating birds, Baltimore orioles seem to prefer only ripe, dark-colored fruit. Orioles seek out the darkest mulberries, the reddest cherries, and the deepest-purple grapes, and will ignore green grapes and yellow cherries even if they are ripe. Baltimore orioles sometimes use their bills to "gape", stabbing their closed bill into soft fruits, then opening them to lap the juice with their tongues. During spring and fall, nectar, fruit, and other sugary foods are readily converted into fat, which supplies energy for migration. Many people now attract Baltimore orioles to their backyards with oriole feeders. Many contain essentially the same food as hummingbird feeders, but are designed for orioles, are orange instead of red, and have larger perches. Baltimore orioles are also fond of halved oranges, grape jelly, and in their winter quarters, the red arils of gumbo-limbo (Bursera simaruba). If they discover a well-kept feeder, orioles lead their young there.

== See also ==
- Orchard oriole
- Scott's oriole
- Audubon's oriole
